= Shibboleth (software) =

Single-sign on system

- Type: Single sign-on system
- License: Apache 2.0
- Website: www.shibboleth.net

Shibboleth is a single sign-on log-in system for computer networks and the Internet. It allows people to sign in using just one identity to various systems run by federations of different organizations or institutions. The federations are often universities or public service organizations.

The Shibboleth Internet2 middleware initiative created an architecture and open-source implementation for identity management and federated identity-based authentication and authorization (or access control) infrastructure based on Security Assertion Markup Language (SAML). Federated identity allows the sharing of information about users from one security domain to the other organizations in a federation. This allows for cross-domain single sign-on and removes the need for content providers to maintain usernames and passwords. Identity providers (IdPs) supply user information, while service providers (SPs) consume this information and give access to secure content.

== History ==
The Shibboleth Project grew out of Internet2. As of June 2025, the project is managed by the Shibboleth Consortium. Two of the most popular software components managed by the Shibboleth Consortium are the Shibboleth Identity Provider and the Shibboleth Service Provider, both of which are implementations of SAML.

The project was named after an identifying passphrase used in the Bible (Judges 12:4–6) because Ephraimites were not able to pronounce "sh".

The Shibboleth project was started in 2000 to facilitate the sharing of resources between organizations with incompatible authentication and authorization infrastructures. Architectural work was performed for over a year prior to any software development. After development and testing, Shibboleth IdP 1.0 was released in July 2003. This was followed by the release of Shibboleth IdP 1.3 in August 2005.

Version 2.0 of the Shibboleth software was a major upgrade released in March 2008. It included both IdP and SP components, but, more importantly, Shibboleth 2.0 supported SAML 2.0.

The Shibboleth and SAML protocols were developed during the same timeframe. From the beginning, Shibboleth was based on SAML, but, where SAML was found lacking, Shibboleth improvised, and the Shibboleth developers implemented features that compensated for missing features in SAML 1.1. Some of these features were later incorporated into SAML 2.0, and, in that sense, Shibboleth contributed to the evolution of the SAML protocol.

Perhaps the most important contributed feature was the legacy Shibboleth AuthnRequest protocol. Since the SAML 1.1 protocol was inherently an IdP-first protocol, Shibboleth invented a simple HTTP-based authentication request protocol that turned SAML 1.1 into an SP-first protocol. This protocol was first implemented in Shibboleth IdP 1.0 and later refined in Shibboleth IdP 1.3.

Building on that early work, the Liberty Alliance introduced a fully expanded AuthnRequest protocol into the Liberty Identity Federation Framework. Eventually, Liberty ID-FF 1.2 was contributed to OASIS, which formed the basis for the OASIS SAML 2.0 Standard.

== Architecture ==
Shibboleth is a web-based technology that implements the HTTP/POST artifact and attribute push profiles of SAML, including both Identity Provider (IdP) and Service Provider (SP) components. Shibboleth 1.3 has its own technical overview, architectural document, and conformance document that build on top of the SAML 1.1 specifications.

=== Shibboleth 1.3 ===
In the canonical use case:

1. A user first accesses a resource hosted by a web server (the service provider) that has Shibboleth content protection enabled.
2. The SP crafts a proprietary authentication request that is passed through the browser using URL query parameters to supply the requester's SAML entityID, the assertion consumption location, and optionally the end page to return the user to.
3. The user is redirected to either their home IdP or a WAYF (Where Are You From) service, where they select their home IdP for further redirection.
4. The user authenticates to an access control mechanism external to Shibboleth.
5. Shibboleth generates a SAML 1.1 authentication assertion with a temporary "handle" contained within it. This handle allows the IdP to recognize a request about a particular browser user as corresponding to the principal that authenticated earlier.
6. The user is POSTed to the assertion consumer service of the SP. The SP consumes the assertion and issues an AttributeQuery to the IdP's attribute service for attributes about that user, which may or may not include the user's identity.
7. The IdP sends an attribute assertion containing trusted information about the user to the SP.
8. The SP either makes an access control decision based on the attributes or supplies information to applications to make decisions themselves.

Shibboleth supports a number of variations on this base case, including portal-style flows whereby the IdP mints an unsolicited assertion to be delivered in the initial access to the SP, and lazy session initiation, which allows an application to trigger content protection through a method of its choice as required.

Shibboleth 1.3 and earlier do not provide a built-in authentication mechanism, but any Web-based authentication mechanism can be used to supply user data for Shibboleth to use. Common systems for this purpose include CAS or Pubcookie. The authentication and single-sign-on features of the Java container in which the IdP runs (Tomcat, for example) can also be used.

=== Shibboleth 2.0 ===
Shibboleth 2.0 builds on SAML 2.0 standards. The IdP in Shibboleth 2.0 has to do additional processing in order to support passive and forced authentication requests in SAML 2.0. The SP can request a specific method of authentication from the IdP. Shibboleth 2.0 supports additional encryption capacity.

== Attributes ==
Shibboleth's access control is performed by matching attributes supplied by IdPs against rules defined by SPs. An attribute is any piece of information about a user, such as "member of this community", "Alice Smith", or "licensed under contract A". User identity is considered an attribute, and is only passed when explicitly required, which preserves user privacy. Attributes can be written in Java or pulled from directories and databases. Standard X.520 attributes are most commonly used, but new attributes can be arbitrarily defined as long as they are understood and interpreted similarly by the IdP and SP in a transaction.

== Trust ==
Trust between domains is implemented using public key cryptography (often simply TLS server certificates) and metadata that describes providers. The use of information passed is controlled through agreements. Federations are often used to simplify these relationships by aggregating large numbers of providers that agree to use common rules and contracts.

== Development ==
Shibboleth is open-source and provided under the Apache 2 license. Many extensions have been contributed by other groups.

== See also ==
- OpenAthens
