= SAML-based products and services =

List of computer security products

Security Assertion Markup Language (SAML) is a set of specifications that encompasses the XML-format for security tokens containing assertions to pass information about a user and protocols and profiles to implement authentication and authorization scenarios. This article has a focus on software and services in the category of identity management infrastructure, which enable building Web-SSO solutions using the SAML protocol in an interoperable fashion. Software and services that are only SAML-enabled do not go here.

== Products that provide SAML actors ==
SAML actors are Identity Providers (IdP), Service Providers (SP), Discovery Services, ECP Clients, Metadata Services, or Broker/IdP-proxy. This table shows the capability of products according to Kantara Initiative testing. Claimed capabilities are in column "other". Each mark denotes that at least one interoperability test was passed. Detailed results with product and test procedure versions are available at the Kantara/Liberty site given below.

NOTE: This table represents a snapshot over time roll up of the most recent product test results (multiple testing rounds). Please note that some products features and abilities may have been updated since they were last tested. Please check the website information of the originating product for the latest features and updates.

Product Name	Project/Vendor	License	Kantara-certified Interoperability							Other Features							
Product Name	Project/Vendor	License	IdP	IdP Light	SP	SP Light	eGov 1.5	Attr Auth Resp	POST Bind.	Roles							Protocols
Product Name	Project/Vendor	License	IdP	IdP Light	SP	SP Light	eGov 1.5	Attr Auth Resp	POST Bind.	Broker	Discovery	ECP	IdP	IdP Proxy	Reverse Proxy	SP	Protocols
10Duke Identity Provider	10Duke	Commercial											Yes			Yes	SAML 1.1, SAML 2.0, OAuth 2, OpenID, LDAP, Federation
adAS SSO	PRiSE	OSS	Yes	Yes	Yes	Yes	Yes	Yes	Yes				Yes			Yes	SAML 2.0, SAML 1.0, Google, Microsoft365, Facebook, Twitter, Kerberos, LDAP, Federation, OAuth2, OpenID Connect, CAS v1, CAS v2, PAPI, OpenID
ADFS 1.x	Microsoft	Commercial		Yes		Yes	Yes						Yes				WS-Federation, WS-Trust, SAML 1.0
ADFS 2.0	Microsoft	Commercial		Yes		Yes	Yes						Yes				WS-Federation, WS-Trust, SAML 1.1/2.0
ADFS 2.1	Microsoft	Commercial		Yes		Yes	Yes						Yes				WS-Federation, WS-Trust, SAML 2.0
ADFS 3.0	Microsoft	Commercial		Yes		Yes	Yes						Yes				WS-Federation, WS-Trust, SAML 2.0, OAuth2
ADFS 4.0	Microsoft	Commercial		Yes		Yes	Yes						Yes				WS-Federation, WS-Trust, SAML 2.0, OAuth2, OpenID Connect
Aerobase	Aerobase	OSS	Yes		Yes								Yes				Integrated SSO and IDM for browser apps and RESTful web services. Built on top of the OAuth 2.0, OpenID Connect, JSON Web Token (JWT) and SAML 2.0 specifications
Afrilas	Able - AXS Guard	Commercial	Yes										Yes				SAML 2.0 Strong Authentication without usernames
Asimba	Asimba.org	OSS											Yes				(Fork of OpenASelect)
AssureBridge SAMLConnect	AssureBridge	Commercial		Yes		Yes		Yes	Yes				Yes			Yes	SAML 1.1, SAML 2.0, OpenID, WS-Federation, Kerberos, Radius, X509, LDAP
Auth0	Auth0	Commercial	Yes		Yes								Yes			Yes	OAuth2, OpenID, SAML 1.1, SAML 2.0, WS-Federation, LDAP
Authentic2	Entrouvert	OSS											Yes			Yes	OpenID 1&2, CAS 1&2, OAuth2, LDAP 2&3, PAM, RADIUS, OATH, Kerberos, X509
AuthStack	Buckhill	Commercial	Yes	Yes	Yes	Yes		Yes	Yes				Yes			Yes	SAML 1.0, SAML 1.1, SAML 2.0, LDAP, Kerberos, X509, RADIUS, OAuth2, SOAP/REST API
BIG-IP Access Policy Manager	F5 Networks	Commercial								Yes			Yes			Yes	SAML 2.0
Bitium	Bitium	Commercial											Yes			Yes	SAML, SAML 2.0
CA Single Sign-On	CA	Commercial		Yes		Yes	Yes	Yes	Yes				Yes			Yes	SAML 1.0/1/1/2.0, OAuth2, OpenID, WS-Federation
Central Authentication Server (CAS)	Apereo Foundation	Open source	Yes										Yes				SAML 2.0, OAuth2, OpenID, WS-Federation
Centrify DirectControl	Centrify	Commercial								Yes							SAML, OpenID, OAuth, WS-*, LDAP, Kerberos
Ceptor	Ceptor	Commercial											Yes			Yes	SAML 1.1/2.0, OAuth 2.0, WS-Federation, OpenID Connect, Kerberos
cidaas	cidaas by Widas ID GmbH	Commercial											Yes			Yes	SAML 2.0, OAuth2, OpenID Connect
Citrix Open Cloud	Citrix	Commercial								Yes							SSO Middleware, native service connectors
Cloud Identity Manager	McAfee	Commercial								Yes							SAML 2, OpenID, OAuth, XACML, LDAP v3, JM
Cloud Federation Service	Radiant Logic	Commercial											Yes			Yes	SAML 2.0, WS-Federation, OAuth 2.0, OpenID
Cloudseal	Cloudseal	SaaS											Yes			Yes	
Cognito	Amazon	Commercial											Yes				SAML 2.0
Comfact IDP	Comfact	Commercial											Yes				
Signicat	Signicat	Commercial											Yes			Yes	
Corto project home	GÉANT	OSS								Yes							
DACS	Safran Identity & Security	Commercial											Yes	Yes			SSO, OpenID Connect, OATH & OCRA, SMS, X509v3 Certificate, eID card, FIDO UAF, LDAP/AD, multi-factor
Dot Net Workflow	The Dot Net Factory	Commercial	Yes		Yes								Yes			Yes	WS*-, WS-Federation, WS-Trust, OpenID, OAuth 2.0, Facebook, LinkedIn, Twitter, Yahoo, Windows Live (MSN)
DirX Access	Atos/Siemens	Commercial		Yes		Yes		Yes									
DualShield	Deepnet Security	Commercial		Yes		Yes		Yes	Yes				Yes				SAML 2.0
Elastic SSO Team	9STAR	Commercial	Yes	Yes				Yes	Yes				Yes				SAML 2.0 SAML 1.1
Elastic SSO Enterprise	9STAR	Commercial	Yes	Yes				Yes	Yes				Yes				SAML 2.0 SAML 1.1
ESOE	Queensland University of Technology	OSS											Yes			Yes	
Entra ID (formerly known as Azure Active Directory)	Microsoft	Commercial	Yes										Yes			Yes	SAML 2.0, WS-Federation, Kerberos Constrained Delegation, OAuth 2.0, OpenID Connect
Entrust GetAccess	Entrust	Commercial	Yes	Yes	Yes	Yes	Yes	Yes	Yes				Yes			Yes	SAML 1.0, SAML 1.1, SAML 2.0
Entrust IdentityGuard	Entrust	Commercial	Yes	Yes	Yes	Yes	Yes		Yes				Yes				SAML 2.0, OpenID
EIC	Ericsson	Commercial	Yes														
EmpowerID	The Dot Net Factory	Commercial											Yes			Yes	WS*-, WS-Federation, WS-Trust, OpenID, OAuth 2.0, Facebook, LinkedIn, Twitter, Yahoo, Windows Live (MSN)
Evidian Web Access Manager	Evidian	Commercial	Yes	Yes	Yes	Yes		Yes	Yes				Yes			Yes	SAML 1.1, SAML 2.0, OpenID Connect, CAS 1&2, OAuth2, LDAP v3, RADIUS, OATH, Kerberos, X509, Microsoft365, Google, Multi-factor, SSO, extended integration functionalities, Federation
Fluig Identity	TOTVS	Commercial											Yes			Yes	SAML 2.0
Forum Sentry	Forum Systems	Commercial											Yes			Yes	WS-Federation, WS-Trust, SAML 2.0, SAML 1.1, OAuth 1.0.a. OAuth 2, OpenID Connect
Fugen Cloud ID Broker	Fugen Solutions	Commercial								Yes							SAML 1.1, SAML 2.0, WS-Federation, WS-Trust, OpenID, and OAuth
FusionAuth	FusionAuth	Commercial											Yes			Yes	SAML 2.0, OIDC, OAuth, LDAP
GlobalSign SSO	GMO GlobalSign	Commercial	Yes	Yes	Yes	Yes			Yes		Yes	Yes					SAML 2.0, ETSI MSS 102 204, TUPAS, WS-Federation, OpenID
Gluu Server	Gluu	OSS	Yes	Yes									Yes				OpenID Connect, UMA, RADIUS, LDAP, FIDO, OAuth
Hitachi ID Identity and Access Management Suite	Hitachi ID Systems, Inc.	Commercial											Yes			Yes	SAML 2.0
Horizon App Manager	VMware	Commercial	Yes	Yes	Yes	Yes		Yes					?				
HP IceWall SSO	HP	Commercial														Yes	SAML 2
ILANTUS Sign On Express	Ilantus	Commercial											Yes			Yes	SAML 2
Intel Cloud SSO	Intel	Commercial											Yes			Yes	SAML 2, OpenID, OAuth
Ilex Sign&go	ILEX	Commercial	Yes	Yes	Yes	Yes	Yes	Yes	Yes				Yes			Yes	WS-Federation, WS-Trust, SAML 2.0, SAML 1.0, Shibboleth, CAS, Google, Microsoft365, Facebook, Kerberos, LDAP
iSAML	Avoco	Commercial											Yes				SAML 2, WS-Trust, OpenID
iWelcome	iWelcome	Commercial	Yes	Yes	Yes	Yes	Yes	Yes	Yes				Yes				SAML 2, SAML 1.0, WS-Trust, Kerberos, OAuth2, Facebook, google, includes provisioning from-to on-Prem, AD, Multi-factor, extended integration functionalities
JOSSO (Community Ed.)	josso.org	OSS							Yes				Yes			Yes	SAML2, OAuth2, WS-Trust, SPMLV2, Kerberos, JOSSO1
JOSSO (Enterprise Ed.)	Atricore	Commercial							Yes				Yes			Yes	SAML2, WS-Fed, OpenID Connect, OAuth2, WS-Trust, SPMLV2, Kerberos, JOSSO1
Juniper SSL VPN	Juniper Networks	Commercial											Yes			Yes	
Keycloak	JBoss	OSS											Yes				Integrated SSO and IDM for browser apps and RESTful web services. Built on top of the OAuth 2.0, OpenID Connect, JSON Web Token (JWT) and SAML 2.0 specifications
Layer 7	SecureSpan Gateway	Commercial		Yes		Yes											PDP/PEP, Auth2, SAML 1.1, SAML2, ABAC, OpenID Connect, XML Firewall
Larpe	Entrouvert	OSS		Yes		Yes									Yes		SAML, OpenID, CAS, OAuth
LemonLDAP::NG	LemonLDAP::NG	OSS											Yes			Yes	SSO, WS-Federation, CAS, OpenID-Connect, SAML-2, Twitter, Protocol proxy
LoginRadius	LoginRadius	Commercial											Yes			Yes	Web SSO, Federation SSO, SAML, OAuth, OIDC, WS-Federation, JWT
MicroFocus (NetIQ) Access Manager	NetIQ (formerly Novell)	Commercial	Yes	Yes	Yes	Yes	Yes	Yes	Yes				Yes	Yes		Yes + SP Broker	WS-Security, WS-Federation, WS-Trust, SAML 1.1 / 2.0, Liberty, Single Sign-on, RBAC, CardSpace, OAuth 2.0, OpenID, STS. Includes out of the box integration with cloud and social media providers (Office 365, Windows Live (MSN), Google, Facebook, Salesforce, Amazon web services and 200+ preconfigured connections to SaaS providers etc.) Integration for Advanced Authentication Framework
NetWeaver Appserver	SAP	Commercial											?				CAS, OpenId, Twitter
OneGate	MobilityGuard	Commercial	Yes	Yes	Yes	Yes	Yes	Yes	Yes				Yes			Yes	SAML 1.1, SAML 2.0
OpenAM	Open Identity Community , ForgeRock (ex. Sun) until 2016	CDDL	Yes	Yes	Yes	Yes	Yes	Yes	Yes			Yes		Yes			OpenID Connect, OAuth2, SAML 2.0, SAML 1.1, WS-Federation, WS-Trust, XACML, Liberty, Kerberos, Facebook, Google, Windows Live (MSN)
Okta	Okta	Commercial											Yes			Yes	WS-Federation, WS-Trust, SAML 2.0, OAuth2, OpenID Connect
OneLogin	OneLogin	Commercial											Yes			Yes	SAML, WS-Federation, Kerberos, OAuth, OpenID
OpenAthens LA	eduserv	Commercial											Yes				
OpenAthens SP	eduserv	Commercial														Yes	
Open Select	OpenASelect.org	OSS											Yes				OAuth (project continues as asimba)
Optimal IdM VIS Federation Services	Optimal IdM	Commercial	Yes		Yes				Yes	Yes			Yes			Yes + Proxy, SSO	WS-Federation, WS-Trust, SAML 1.x, SAML 2.0, OAuth2, OpenID Connect, SCIM, Facebook, Twitter, LinkedIn, Google, IWA, X509, Kerberos, LDAP, Office 365, RADIUS, MFA (Push, SMS, Email, Voice, TOTP, U2F, Radius)
Oracle Identity Federation 11g	Oracle	Commercial	Yes		Yes				Yes				Yes			Yes	WS-Federation, SAML 1.x, SAML 2.0, OpenID 2.0
Pega 7 Platform	Pegasystems Inc.	Commercial			Yes	Yes			Yes							Yes	SAML 2.0, OAuth, WS-Trust, LDAP
PhoneFactor	PhoneFactor, Inc	Commercial											Yes				
PicketLink	JBoss Community	OSS															OpenID, A-Select, CAS, XACML
PingFederate	Ping Identity	Commercial		Yes		Yes				Yes			Yes			Yes	SAML 1.1, SAML 2.0, WS-Federation, WS-Trust, WS-Security, OAuth, OpenID Connect, OpenID, SCIM, Facebook, Twitter, LinkedIn, Google, Windows Live, Kerberos, IWA, X.509, LDAP, RADIUS, 3rd Party MFA
Plurilock AI	Plurilock	Commercial											Yes			Yes	SAML 1.1, SAML 2.0, FIDO2, OTP, DEFEND
PortalGuard	PistolStar, Inc.	Commercial											Yes			Yes	SAML 2, LDAP v3, XML-DSIG, SSO Middleware
RSA Federated Identity	RSA	Commercial		Yes		Yes	Yes										Facebook, OpenID, LinkedIn, Twitter, Windows Live
SAASPASS	SAASPASS	Commercial											Yes			Yes	WS-Federation, WS-Trust, SAML 2.0, OAuth2, OpenID Connect, LDAP
Safewhere*Identify	Safewhere	Commercial											Yes			Yes	SAML 2.0, WS-Federation, WS-Trust, OAuth 2.0, multi-factor, OpenID Connect, Facebook, LinkedIn, Twitter, LiveID, Google, LDAP
SailPoint IdentityNow	SailPoint	Commercial											Yes			Yes	SAML 1.1, SAML 2.0, OAuth2, Kerberos, WS-Federation
Samanage	Samanage	Commercial								Yes							Enterprise-to-cloud SSO Middleware
SATOSA	SATOSA	OSS								Yes							Proxy between SAML2, OpenID Connect and OAuth2
SecureAuth	SecureAuth Corp.	Commercial	Yes	Yes	Yes	Yes	Yes	Yes	Yes				Yes			Yes	2-Factor, IBM LTPA, Facebook, Google, LinkedIn, Microsoft FBA, Microsoft IWA, OAUTH, OpenID, OpenID Connect, SAML 1.1, SAML 2.0, Twitter, WebServices, Windows Live, X.509v3, Yahoo
SecureSSO	SurePassID	Commercial											Yes			Yes	WS-Federation, WS-Trust, SAML 2.0, OAuth2, OpenID Connect, O365, SCADA - cloud & on-prem
Shibboleth	Internet2	OSS									Yes		Yes			Yes	SAML 1.1, SAML 2.0
SimpleSAMLphp	UNINETT AS	OSS		Yes		Yes											OpenID, A-Select, CAS, WS-Federation and OAuth, Facebook, LinkedIn, Twitter, Windows Live, SAML 2
Smartsignin	PerfectCloud	Commercial											Yes			Yes	SAML 2.0, SAML 1.0, Google, Microsoft365, LDAP, WS-Federation
SMS PASSCODE Multi-factor Authentication	SMS PASSCODE	Commercial											?				
SSO EasyConnect	SSO Easy	Commercial											Yes			Yes	
SSOGEN	SSOGEN Corporation	Commercial								Yes			Yes	Yes	Yes	Yes	SAML 2.0, OpenID Connect, OAuth 2.0, SCIM 2.0, LDAP, Kerberos (SPNEGO), RADIUS, WebAuthn (FIDO2 passkeys), TOTP; single sign-on for Oracle E-Business Suite, PeopleSoft, JD Edwards, Siebel and Oracle HTTP Server
Symlabs Federated Identity Suite	Symlabs	Commercial	Yes	Yes	Yes	Yes	Yes	Yes				Yes					OpenID, A-Select, CAS, WS-Federation and OAuth
Symplified	Symplified	Commercial	Yes	Yes	Yes	Yes	Yes	Yes	Yes	Yes			Yes			Yes	SAML 1.1, SAML 2.0, WS-Federation, OpenID, OAuth, XACML, IBM LTPA, Microsoft IWA, 2-Factor, Facebook, Google, Twitter, ABAC / context-based AC
Tivoli Federated Identity Manager	IBM	Commercial	Yes	Yes	Yes	Yes	Yes	Yes	Yes								WS-Federation, OpenID, Liberty, InfoCard, Microsoft CardSpace
TrustBind	NTT Software Corp	Commercial	Yes		Yes		Yes	Yes	Yes			Yes					OpenID, ID-WSF
TrustBuilder	SecurIT	Commercial											Yes	Yes		Yes	SAML 2.0, OAuth 2.0, OpenID Connect, Kerberos
Trustelem	Trustelem	Commercial											Yes				SAML 2.0, OpenID Connect, WS-Fed, OAuth 2.0, Integrated Windows Authentication, Kerberos, Active Directory, LDAP, FIDO U2F.
USP Secure Entry Server	United Security Providers	Commercial											Yes	Yes		Yes	SAML 2.0, SAML 1.0, Kerberos, NTLM, LDAP, RADIUS, RSA, SuisseID, RBAC, SSO, Tomcat Authenticator, IIS ISAPI Filter, mTAN, PKI/X.509, Reverse Proxy, Multi-Factor, SOAP/REST Connectors, WebService Security, Office365, GoogleApps
Weblogic	Oracle	Commercial														Yes	
WSO2	wso2	OSS											Yes			Yes	OAuth2, WS-Trust, OpenID
ZITADEL	ZITADEL	OSS									Yes		Yes				SAML 2.0, OpenID Connect 1.0, OAuth 2.0, FIDO2, OTP, U2F
ZXID	zxid	OSS									Yes	Yes	Yes	Yes		Yes	ID-WSF2, XACML2, WS-Security, XML-DSIG, TAS3

== Libraries and toolkits to develop SAML actors and SAML-enabled services ==
Libraries and toolkits are used by developers to integrate applications and services into SAML federations or to build their own SAML-actors like IdPs.

Libraries and Toolkits	Organization	Licence	Purpose and Language bindings
Australian Access Federation	Australian Access Federation	OSS	Metadata Registry based on former work by SWITCH
ComponentSpace	ComponentSpace	Commercial	SAML libraries for ASP.NET and ASP.NET Core applications
Corto	WAYF	OSS	SAML2 proxy, virtual IdP, user consent
DjangoSAML2	GitHub	OSS	SAML2 application for Django, using PySAML2 underneath
EmpowerID IdP & SP Kit	Dot Net Factory	Commercial	IdP and SP Kit, .NET, REST, and SOAP-based integration kit to SAML-enable applications
FEMMA	SourceForge	OSS	Workaround for the ADFS limitation of a single EntityID per XML infoset
Firefox ECP Plugin	Openliberty	OSS	Firefox extension for compliance with SAML ECP
FLOG F-Ticks Vizualization	SUNET	OSS	Parse and chart F-Ticks for webSSO and Eduroam
Jagger	HEAnet	OSS	Metadata and Federation data manager; Shibboleth IDP GUI
JAKOB	WAYF	OSS	Backchannel attribute collector
JANUS	WAYF	OSS	Metadata Registry for hub-and-spoke federations based on SimpleSAMLphp; includes self-service
Jitbit ASP.NET SAML lib	GitHub	OSS	SAML 2.0 "consumer" component for ASP.NET
Lasso	Entrouvert	OSS	SAML-Library: C/C++, Python, Java, Perl, PHP
LightSAML core		OSS	SAML-Library: PHP
OIOSAML 2.0 Toolkit	Danish IT and Telekom Agency	OSS	SP Framework: Java, .NET, PHP (Documentation see OIOSAML.java)
OmniAuth-Shibboleth	OneLogin	OSS	SAML-Library: ASP/.NET, Java, PHP, Python, Ruby
OneLogin	OneLogin	OSS	SAML-Library: ASP/.NET, Java, PHP, Python, Ruby
OpenConext	SURFnet	OSS	Service Provider Proxy and Hub-and-Spoke federation middleware, includes SAML proxy and central group management for creating collaboration platforms
OpenSAML	Internet2	OSS	SAML-Library: C++, Java
MET	TERENA	OSS	gathers and shows information about federations (mostly about SPs and IdPs)
Mujina	SURFnet	OSS	SAML test actors that can be dynamically configured using a REST interface
PAC4J-SAML		OSS	SAML Service Provider Library (and other authentication mechanisms)
PEER	GÉANT	OSS	SAML Metadata Registry
PHPH	WAYF.dk	OSS	SAML Metadata Processor
Ping Identity	Ping Identity	Commercial	Java, .NET, PHP and language neutral integration kits to SAML-enable applications
PySAML2	GitHub	OSS	SAML-Library: Python
Python-SAML	OneLogin	OSS	SAML-Library: Python
Pysfemma	GitHub	OSS	automate membership configuration of an ADFS STS in a SAML2 based Identity Federation
PyFF	SUNET	OSS	SAML Metadata Processor
Raptor	Jisc	OSS	toolkit to enable Shibboleth IdP statistics analysis
SAML Metadata Aggregator	NORDUnet	OSS	Aggregates single metadata files and provides MDX webservice
SAML Tracer (Firefox addon)	UNINETT AS	OSS	Firefox Plug-In to trace SAML messages
SecureBlackbox	/n software	Commercial	The component that implements SAML in client apps, which need to use service providers, or can be used to create your own service and identity providers
SpringSecurity SAML	SpringSource	OSS	SAML-enable applications based on Spring framework
Switch GMT	SWITCH-AAI	OSS	Group Management Tool for Shibboleth
Webisoget		OSS	Command-line Tool to fetch a SSO-protected page including Shibboleth-Login
ZXID	zxid	OSS	C, other lang using swig.org

== SAML-related services ==
This section lists public services such as identity and attribute providers, metadata and test services, but *not* SAML-enabled web-applications and cloud services.

Service	Organization	Purpose
9STAR	9STAR	9STAR Managed Services for Shibboleth/SAML SSO On-Premises or Cloud
9STAR	9STAR	9STAR Shibboleth/SAML SSO Support Services
Acrot A-OK	Arcot	IdP (+ Fraud detection)
eduTEAMs	SURFnet	Federation enabled Group management service which acts as an Attribute Authority for group relations
Federation Lab	GÉANT	Test-SP, metadata registry, test tools
Feide OpenIdP	UNINETT AS	IdP that allows any user to register, and any SP to connect
Gazelle IHE validator	Gazelle	SAML Assertion Validation
Gluu On-Prem Managed Service	Gluu	IdP for SAML and OpenID Connect-enabled cloud services
Identity Hub	Entrouvert	Free IdP; Any user and any SP
OneLogin SSO	OneLogin	IdP for SAML- and OpenID-enabled cloud services
REEP	GÉANT	Public metadata registry
PhoneFactor	PhoneFactor Inc.	IdP/cloud SSO
PingOne	Ping Identity	Cloud Access and Application Provider Services for IdPs and SPs
SAASPASS	SAASPASS	IdP, IdM, Multi-Protocol STS (multiple claims based integrations including SAML 1.1, 2.0 SP SSO, 2.0 IdP SSO, OpenID Connect, .NET, CA SiteMinder and others
SamlComponent.net	SamlComponent	SAML Resources for Developers
samlidp.io	Kitek Media Kft.	SAML Identity Provider as a Service
SecureAuth	SecureAuth Corp.	IdP, IdM, Multi-Protocol STS (multiple claims based integrations including SAML 1.1, 2.0 SP SSO, 2.0 IdP SSO, OpenID, .NET, CA SiteMinder and others
SSOCircle	SSOCircle	Free IdP
Testshib	Internet2	IdP and SP for testing
UnitedID	United ID Services	Free IDP service
Verizon Web Access Management	Verizon Business	IdP
ZXID	zxid.org	Free IdP
