= Avatier =

American software development company

- Type: Private
- Industry: Software
- Founded: 1997
- Founder: Nelson Cicchitto
- Headquarters: Pleasanton, CA, United States
- Area served: Worldwide
- Products: Identity management software
- Services: IT services
- Number of employees: 93
- Website: www.avatier.com

Avatier Corporation is Pleasanton, CA based software development company notable for its identity management software.

== History ==
Avatier Corporation was founded in 1997 by Nelson Cicchitto and David Matthiesen. The corporation invented and patented the world's first Identity Access IT Store with automatic workflow. This took a different approach than traditional Identity and Access Governance Risk Management software market.

In 2006, the company developed and patented the only access management integrated ITIL-based business services catalog. This was done by fusing the catalog with an operationally efficient identity management and access governance system.

Currently, the company is based in Pleasanton, CA and has offices in 10 major cities worldwide.
