= SAML 1.1 =

Computer markup language

Security Assertion Markup Language (SAML) is an XML standard for exchanging authentication and authorization data between security domains. SAML is a product of the OASIS (organization) Security Services Technical Committee.

SAML 1.1 was ratified as an OASIS standard in September 2003. The critical aspects of SAML 1.1 are covered in detail in the official documents SAMLCore and SAMLBind. If you are new to SAML, you should probably read the introductory SAML topic first, and then the SAMLOverview document from OASIS.

Prior to SAML 1.1, SAML 1.0 was adopted as an OASIS standard in November 2002. SAML has undergone one minor (V1.1) and one major revision (V2.0) since V1.0, which itself is a relatively simple protocol. SAML 1.0 is of more than historical interest, however, since the US Federal E-Authentication Initiative has adopted SAML 1.0 as its core technology.

Versions 1.0 and 1.1 of SAML are similar. See SAMLDiff for specific differences between the two standards. This article concentrates on SAML 1.1 since it is an important standard upon which many other standards and implementations depend.

Warning: Implementers and deployers should note well that all code examples in this article are non-normative and for illustration purposes only. Consult the OASIS SAML specifications for normative requirements.

== SAML 1.1 Assertions ==
SAML assertions contain statements that service providers use to make access control decisions. For instance, authentication statements assert to the service provider that the principal did indeed authenticate with the identity provider at a particular time using a particular method of authentication. Other information about the principal may be disclosed in an authentication statement. In the authentication statement below, for example, the e-mail address of the principal is asserted to the service provider:

  <saml:Assertion
    xmlns:saml="urn:oasis:names:tc:SAML:1.0:assertion"
    MajorVersion="1" MinorVersion="1"
    AssertionID="buGxcG4gILg5NlocyLccDz6iXrUa"
    Issuer="https://idp.example.org/saml"
    IssueInstant="2002-06-19T17:05:37.795Z">
    <saml:Conditions
      NotBefore="2002-06-19T17:00:37.795Z"
      NotOnOrAfter="2002-06-19T17:10:37.795Z"/>
    <saml:AuthenticationStatement
      AuthenticationMethod="urn:oasis:names:tc:SAML:1.0:am:password"
      AuthenticationInstant="2002-06-19T17:05:17.706Z">
      <saml:Subject>
        <saml:NameIdentifier
          Format="urn:oasis:names:tc:SAML:1.1:nameid-format:emailAddress">
          user@idp.example.org
        </saml:NameIdentifier>
        <saml:SubjectConfirmation>
          <saml:ConfirmationMethod>
            urn:oasis:names:tc:SAML:1.0:cm:bearer
          </saml:ConfirmationMethod>
        </saml:SubjectConfirmation>
      </saml:Subject>
    </saml:AuthenticationStatement>
  </saml:Assertion>

An e-mail address (as in the above example) will suffice in a large number of situations. In some cases, however, additional information is needed before a service provider can make an access control decision. As an example, suppose that students are allowed to access scholarships data. An attribute statement can indicate whether or not the principal has an affiliation of "student", which the service provider uses to allow or deny access (resp.) to the scholarships application:

  <saml:Assertion
    xmlns:saml="urn:oasis:names:tc:SAML:1.0:assertion"
    MajorVersion="1" MinorVersion="1"
    Issuer="https://idp.example.org/saml" ...>
    <saml:Conditions NotBefore="..." NotAfter="..."/>
    <saml:AuthenticationStatement
      AuthenticationMethod="..."
      AuthenticationInstant="...">
      <saml:Subject>...</saml:Subject>
    </saml:AuthenticationStatement>
    <saml:AttributeStatement>
      <saml:Subject>...</saml:Subject>
      <saml:Attribute
        AttributeName="urn:mace:dir:attribute-def:eduPersonAffiliation"
        AttributeNamespace="urn:mace:shibboleth:1.0:attributeNamespace:uri">
        <saml:AttributeValue>member</saml:AttributeValue>
        <saml:AttributeValue>student</saml:AttributeValue>
      </saml:Attribute>
    </saml:AttributeStatement>
  </saml:Assertion>

Attributes are often obtained from an LDAP directory, so consistent representations of attributes across security domains is crucial.

In the above example showing how a student might obtain access to a scholarships application, the service provider is functioning as both a policy enforcement point and a policy decision point. In some situations, it may be preferable to associate the policy decision point with the identity provider. In this case, the service provider passes a URI to the identity provider who asserts an authorization decision statement that dictates whether or not the principal should be allowed access to the secured resource at the given URI.

  <saml:Assertion
    xmlns:saml="urn:oasis:names:tc:SAML:1.0:assertion"
    MajorVersion="1" MinorVersion="1"
    Issuer="https://idp.example.org/saml" ...>
    <saml:Conditions .../>
    <saml:AuthorizationDecisionStatement
      Decision="Permit"
      Resource="https://sp.example.com/confidential_report.html">
      <saml:Subject>...</saml:Subject>
      <saml:Action>read</saml:Action>
    </saml:AuthorizationDecisionStatement>
  </saml:Assertion>

The three statement types are not mutually exclusive. For example, both authentication statements and attribute statements may be included in a single assertion (as shown above). This precludes the need to make subsequent round trips between the service provider and identity provider.

== SAML 1.1 Protocols ==
A SAML protocol is a simple request-response protocol. A SAML requester sends a SAML Request element to a responder:

  <samlp:Request
    xmlns:samlp="urn:oasis:names:tc:SAML:1.0:protocol"
    MajorVersion="1" MinorVersion="1"
    RequestID="aaf23196-1773-2113-474a-fe114412ab72"
    IssueInstant="2006-07-17T22:26:40Z">
    <!-- insert other SAML elements here -->
  </samlp:Request>

Similarly, a SAML responder returns a SAML Response element to the requester:

  <samlp:Response
    xmlns:samlp="urn:oasis:names:tc:SAML:1.0:protocol"
    MajorVersion="1" MinorVersion="1"
    ResponseID="b07b804c-7c29-ea16-7300-4f3d6f7928ac"
    InResponseTo="aaf23196-1773-2113-474a-fe114412ab72"
    IssueInstant="2006-07-17T22:26:41Z">
    <!-- insert other SAML elements here, including assertions -->
  </samlp:Response>

The bindings and profiles needed to affect this message exchange are detailed in the following sections.

== SAML 1.1 Bindings ==
SAML 1.1 formally defines just one protocol binding, the SAML SOAP binding. A compatible SAML 1.1 implementation must implement SAML over SOAP over HTTP (a synchronous protocol binding). Other transport mechanisms besides HTTP are permitted, provided the protocol-independent aspects of the SAML SOAP binding are observed (see section 3.1.2 of SAMLBind).

The SAML 1.1 SOAP binding is built on top of version 1.1 of SOAP (the numbering is purely coincidental). A SAML requester wraps a SAML Request element within the body of a SOAP message. Similarly, a SAML responder returns a SAML Response element within the body of a returned SOAP message. If there is an error, the responder returns a SOAP fault code instead.

Any SAML markup must be included in the SOAP body. SAML 1.1 does not define any SAML-specific SOAP headers. A requester is free to insert any SOAP headers it wishes (although none are required).

Recall that in SOAP 1.1, a SOAPAction HTTP header must be included with each HTTP request (although its value may be empty). A SAML requester may give the following value to the SOAPAction header:

 SOAPAction: http://www.oasis-open.org/committees/security

A SAML responder must not depend on this value, however.

A secure connection is not required for SAML requests and responses, but in those situations where message integrity and confidentiality are required, HTTP over SSL 3.0 or TLS 1.0 with a server-side certificate is required.

A SAML responder may return a "403 Forbidden" response when it refuses to respond to a SAML requester. A responder must return a "500 Internal Server Error" response in the event of a SOAP error (a SOAP fault element must be included as well). Otherwise, a "200 OK" response is returned, even in the presence of a SAML processing error. Such a response will include a SAML Status element in the SOAP body.

== SAML 1.1 Profiles ==
In general, profiles describe the use cases and message exchanges required to ultimately transfer assertions from an identity provider to a service provider. SAML 1.1 specifies two Web Browser SSO Profiles:

1. Browser/POST Profile
2. Browser/Artifact Profile

The Browser/POST Profile relies on a "push" operation that passes an SSO assertion by value through the browser using HTTP POST. We say that the identity provider "pushes" the assertion to the service provider.

The Browser/Artifact Profile employs a "pull" mechanism. The profile essentially passes an SSO assertion from the identity provider to the service provider by reference (through the browser using HTTP Redirect), which is subsequently dereferenced via a back-channel exchange (i.e., the service provider "pulls" the assertion from the identity provider using SAML over SOAP over HTTP).

These profiles support cross-domain single sign-on (SSO). The specification does not define any additional profiles. In particular, SAML 1.1 does not support a profile to secure a web service message nor does it support a single logout profile.

Both SAML 1.1 profiles begin at the inter-site transfer service, which is managed by the identity provider. How the principal arrives at the transfer service in the first place is not dictated by the specification. See sections 4.1 and 4.2 of SAMLOverview for possible scenarios. In practice, a client accessing a secured resource at a service provider will be redirected to the inter-site transfer service at the identity provider, but the precise sequence of steps needed to accomplish this is not outlined by SAML 1.1. (See section 4.3 of SAMLOverview for some rough ideas along these lines.) This scenario is thoroughly addressed in SAML 2.0.

After visiting the inter-site transfer service, the principal is transferred to the assertion consumer service at the service provider. Exactly how the principal is transferred from the inter-site transfer service to the assertion consumer service depends on the profile used. In the case of the Browser/Artifact Profile, a redirect is used; in the case of the Browser/POST Profile, the client issues a POST request (with or without user intervention).

To expedite processing by the assertion consumer service, two separate URLs are specified:

1. Assertion Consumer URL (Browser/POST Profile)
2. Artifact Receiver URL (Browser/Artifact Profile)

These and other endpoint locations may be recorded in metadata files. Exactly how the identity provider obtains a trusted metadata file, or otherwise determines the trusted endpoint locations of a particular service provider, is out of scope with respect to SAML 1.1.

Note that a conforming SAML 1.1 identity provider must provide an inter-site transfer service. Similarly, a SAML 1.1 service provider must provide an assertion consumer service.

=== Browser/POST Profile ===
The SAML 1.1 Browser/POST profile specifies the following four (4) steps. The terminology used in the original specification has been modified slightly to conform to that of the SAML 2.0 specification.

The message flow begins with a request directed at the IdP.

==== Request the Inter-site Transfer Service at the IdP ====
The principal (via an HTTP user agent) requests the Inter-site Transfer Service at the identity provider:

 https://idp.example.org/TransferService?TARGET=target

where target is the desired resource at the service provider, say, https://sp.example.com/home. In other words, the following GET request is issued by the user agent over SSL/TLS:

GET /TransferService?TARGET=target HTTP/1.1
Host: idp.example.org

The profile does not specify how the URL to the Transfer Service (with TARGET parameter) is obtained by the user agent.

==== Respond with an HTML form ====
The Inter-site Transfer Service returns an HTML document containing a FORM element:

HTTP/1.1 200 OK
Content-Type: text/html
Content-Length: nnnn
...
<form method="post" action="https://sp.example.com/ACS/POST" ...>
  <input type="hidden" name="TARGET" value="target" />
  <input type="hidden" name="SAMLResponse" value="''response''" />
  ...
  <input type="submit" value="Submit" />
</form>
...

where the TARGET parameter has been preserved from step 1. The value of the SAMLResponse parameter is the base64 encoding of a SAML Response element such as the following:

  <samlp:Response
    xmlns:samlp="urn:oasis:names:tc:SAML:1.0:protocol"
    MajorVersion="1" MinorVersion="1"
    ResponseID="_P1YaA+Q/wSM/t/8E3R8rNhcpPTM="
    IssueInstant="2002-06-19T17:05:37.795Z">
    <ds:Signature
      xmlns:ds="http://www.w3.org/2000/09/xmldsig#">...</ds:Signature>
    <samlp:Status>
      <samlp:StatusCode Value="samlp:Success"/>
    </samlp:Status>
    <saml:Assertion
      xmlns:saml="urn:oasis:names:tc:SAML:1.0:assertion"
      MajorVersion="1" MinorVersion="1"
      AssertionID="buGxcG4gILg5NlocyLccDz6iXrUa"
      Issuer="https://idp.example.org/saml"
      IssueInstant="2002-06-19T17:05:37.795Z">
      <saml:Conditions
        NotBefore="2002-06-19T17:00:37.795Z"
        NotOnOrAfter="2002-06-19T17:10:37.795Z"/>
      <saml:AuthenticationStatement
        AuthenticationMethod="urn:oasis:names:tc:SAML:1.0:am:password"
        AuthenticationInstant="2002-06-19T17:05:17.706Z">
        <saml:Subject>
          <saml:NameIdentifier
            Format="urn:oasis:names:tc:SAML:1.1:nameid-format:emailAddress">
            user@idp.example.org
          </saml:NameIdentifier>
          <saml:SubjectConfirmation>
            <saml:ConfirmationMethod>
              urn:oasis:names:tc:SAML:1.0:cm:bearer
            </saml:ConfirmationMethod>
          </saml:SubjectConfirmation>
        </saml:Subject>
      </saml:AuthenticationStatement>
    </saml:Assertion>
  </samlp:Response>

The SAML Response must be digitally signed by the identity provider.

Important: It is assumed that the principal has already established a security context at the identity provider, otherwise the Inter-site Transfer Service would be unable to provide an authentication statement in the SAML Response element.

==== Request the Assertion Consumer Service at the SP ====
The user agent requests the Assertion Consumer Service at the service provider:

POST /ACS/POST HTTP/1.1
Host: sp.example.com
Content-Type: application/x-www-form-urlencoded
Content-Length: nnnn
TARGET=target&SAMLResponse=response

where the values of the TARGET and SAMLResponse parameters are taken from the HTML form at step 2.

Note: To automate the submission of the form, the following line of JavaScript may appear anywhere on the page:

  window.onload = function () { document.forms[0].submit(); }

This assumes of course that the page contains a single FORM element (forms[0]).

==== Respond to the principal's request ====
The Assertion Consumer Service consumes the SAML Response element, creates a security context at the service provider and redirects the user agent to the target resource.

=== Browser/Artifact Profile ===
The SAML 1.1 Browser/Artifact profile specifies the following six (6) steps. The terminology used in the original specification has been modified slightly to conform to that of the SAML 2.0 specification.

The message flow begins with a request directed at the IdP.

==== Request the Inter-site Transfer Service at the IdP ====
The principal (via an HTTP user agent) requests the Inter-site Transfer Service at the identity provider:

 https://idp.example.org/TransferService?TARGET=target

where target is the desired resource at the service provider, say, https://sp.example.com/home. In other words, the following GET request is issued by the user agent over SSL/TLS:

GET /TransferService?TARGET=target HTTP/1.1
Host: idp.example.org

The profile does not specify how the URL to the transfer service (with TARGET parameter) is obtained by the user agent.

==== Redirect to the Assertion Consumer Service ====
The principal is redirected to the Assertion Consumer Service at the service provider, that is, the following response is returned to the user agent:

HTTP/1.1 302 Found
Location: https://sp.example.com/ACS/Artifact?TARGET=target&SAMLart=artifact

where artifact is a reference to an assertion the identity provider is willing to provide upon request.

Important: It is assumed that the principal has already established a security context at the identity provider, otherwise the Inter-site Transfer Service would be unable to provide an authentication statement.

==== Request the Assertion Consumer Service at the SP ====
The user agent requests the Assertion Consumer Service at the service provider:

 https://sp.example.com/ACS/Artifact?TARGET=target&SAMLart=artifact

where target and artifact are as before. In other words, the following GET request is issued by the user agent over SSL/TLS:

GET /ACS/Artifact?TARGET=target&SAMLart=artifact HTTP/1.1
Host: sp.example.com

==== Request the Artifact Resolution Service at the IdP ====
The Assertion Consumer Service at the service provider begins a back-channel exchange with the Artifact Resolution Service at the identity provider. A SAML SOAP message is bound to an HTTP POST request:

POST /ArtifactResolutionService HTTP/1.1
Host: idp.example.org
Content-Type: text/xml
Content-Length: nnn
SOAPAction: http://www.oasis-open.org/committees/security
<SOAP-ENV:Envelope
  xmlns:SOAP-ENV="http://schemas.xmlsoap.org/soap/envelope/">
  <SOAP-ENV:Header/>
  <SOAP-ENV:Body>
    <samlp:Request
      xmlns:samlp="urn:oasis:names:tc:SAML:1.0:protocol"
      MajorVersion="1" MinorVersion="1"
      RequestID="_192.168.16.51.1024506224022"
      IssueInstant="2002-06-19T17:03:44.022Z">
      <samlp:AssertionArtifact>
        artifact
      </samlp:AssertionArtifact>
    </samlp:Request>
  </SOAP-ENV:Body>
</SOAP-ENV:Envelope>

where artifact was previously sent from the identity provider to the service provider in steps 2 and 3.

==== Respond with a SAML Assertion ====
The identity provider completes the back-channel exchange by responding with a SAML assertion bound to a SAML SOAP message:

HTTP/1.1 200 OK
Content-Type: text/xml
Content-Length: nnnn
<SOAP-ENV:Envelope
  xmlns:SOAP-ENV="http://schemas.xmlsoap.org/soap/envelope/">
  <SOAP-ENV:Header/>
  <SOAP-ENV:Body>
    <samlp:Response
      xmlns:samlp="urn:oasis:names:tc:SAML:1.0:protocol"
      MajorVersion="1" MinorVersion="1"
      ResponseID="_P1YaA+Q/wSM/t/8E3R8rNhcpPTM="
      InResponseTo="_192.168.16.51.1024506224022"
      IssueInstant="2002-06-19T17:05:37.795Z">
      <samlp:Status>
        <samlp:StatusCode Value="samlp:Success"/>
      </samlp:Status>
      <saml:Assertion
        xmlns:saml="urn:oasis:names:tc:SAML:1.0:assertion"
        MajorVersion="1" MinorVersion="1"
        AssertionID="buGxcG4gILg5NlocyLccDz6iXrUa"
        Issuer="https://idp.example.org/saml"
        IssueInstant="2002-06-19T17:05:37.795Z">
        <saml:Conditions
          NotBefore="2002-06-19T17:00:37.795Z"
          NotOnOrAfter="2002-06-19T17:10:37.795Z"/>
        <saml:AuthenticationStatement
          AuthenticationMethod="urn:oasis:names:tc:SAML:1.0:am:password"
          AuthenticationInstant="2002-06-19T17:05:17.706Z">
          <saml:Subject>
            <saml:NameIdentifier
              Format="urn:oasis:names:tc:SAML:1.1:nameid-format:emailAddress">
              user@idp.example.org
            </saml:NameIdentifier>
            <saml:SubjectConfirmation>
              <saml:ConfirmationMethod>
                urn:oasis:names:tc:SAML:1.0:cm:artifact
              </saml:ConfirmationMethod>
            </saml:SubjectConfirmation>
          </saml:Subject>
        </saml:AuthenticationStatement>
      </saml:Assertion>
    </samlp:Response>
  </SOAP-ENV:Body>
</SOAP-ENV:Envelope>

In this case, the authentication statement includes a NameIdentifier containing the principal's e-mail address.

==== Respond to the principal's request ====
The Assertion Consumer Service parses the SAML Response element, creates a security context at the service provider and redirects the user agent to the target resource.

== See also ==
- SAML
- SAML 2.0
- SAML-based products and services
