= Identity threat detection and response =

Cybersecurity discipline

Identity threat detection and response (ITDR) is a cybersecurity discipline that includes tools and best practices to protect identity management infrastructure from attacks. ITDR can block and detect threats, verify administrator credentials, respond to various attacks, and restore normal operations. Common identity threats include phishing, stolen credentials, insider threats, and ransomware.

ITDR adds an extra layer of security to identity and access management (IAM) systems. It helps secure accounts, permissions, and the identity infrastructure itself from compromise. With attackers targeting identity tools directly, ITDR is becoming more important in 2023 : according to Gartner, established IAM hygiene practices like privileged access management and identity governance are no longer enough.

ITDR can be part of a zero trust security model. ITDR is especially relevant for multicloud infrastructures, which have gaps between cloud providers' distinct IAM implementations. Closing these gaps and orchestrating identity across clouds is an ITDR focus.

== Functionalities ==
ITDR enhances identity and access management (IAM) by adding detection and response capabilities. It provides visibility into potential credential misuse and abuse of privileges. ITDR also finds gaps left by IAM and privileged access management (PAM) systems. ITDR requires monitoring identity systems for misuse and compromise. It uses lower latency detections than general security systems. ITDR involves coordination between IAM and security teams.

ITDR uses the MITRE ATT&CK framework against known attack vectors. It combines foundational IAM controls like multi-factor authentication with monitoring. ITDR prevents compromise of admin accounts and credentials. It modernizes infrastructure through standards like OAuth 2.0.

Organizations adopt ITDR to complement IAM and endpoint detection and response. ITDR specifically monitors identity systems and user activity logs for attacks. It can isolate affected systems and gather forensic data. Adoption requires budget, training, and buy-in. Organizations can start with IAM fundamentals like multi-factor authentication and role-based access control.

ITDR tools can find misconfigurations in Active Directory. Strategies can update firewalls, intrusion systems, and security apps. ITDR integrates with SIEM tools for threat monitoring and automated response. An ITDR incident response plan handles compromised credentials and privilege escalation. Awareness training teaches users to spot identity-based attacks.

== History ==
ITDR emerged as a distinct cybersecurity segment in 2022. In recent years the increase of remote workers and shift to cloud-based workflows has centralized identity as a focal point for attackers, leading to the concept of "identity is the new perimeter". In practice, this reflects a shift from traditional network-based security models, where firewalls and VPNs defined a trusted boundary—to environments where user credentials, access tokens, and authentication sessions have become the primary targets for unauthorized access. Identity threat detection and response as a term was coined by Gartner but is now commonly used by many security vendors.

== Difference between ITDR and EDR ==
While EDR detects issues on endpoints, ITDR concentrates on monitoring and analyzing user activity and access management logs to uncover malicious activity. It gathers data from multiple identity and access management (IAM) sources across on-premises and cloud environments. Together they give a more complete picture to improve detection and response to sophisticated attacks involving lateral movement and identity deception.

== See also ==
- Red team
- Breach and attack simulation
- Security orchestration
