= SAML 2.0 =

Computer markup language

Security Assertion Markup Language
- Abbreviation: SAML
- Status: Published
- Year started: November 2003
- Latest version: V2.0; March 2005
- Preview version: V2.0 with Errata; May 2019
- Organization: Organization for the Advancement of Structured Information Standards (OASIS)
- Committee: OASIS Security Services (SAML) Technical Committee
- Website: OASIS SAML Wiki

Security Assertion Markup Language (SAML) 2.0 is a version of the SAML standard for exchanging authentication and authorization identities between security domains. SAML 2.0 is an XML-based protocol that uses security tokens containing assertions to pass information about a principal (usually an end user) between a SAML authority, named an Identity Provider, and a SAML consumer, named a Service Provider. SAML 2.0 enables web-based, cross-domain single sign-on (SSO), which helps reduce the administrative overhead of distributing multiple authentication tokens to the user. SAML 2.0 was ratified as an OASIS Standard in March 2005, replacing SAML 1.1. The critical aspects of SAML 2.0 are covered in detail in the official documents SAMLCore, SAMLBind, SAMLProf, and SAMLMeta.

Some 30 individuals from more than 24 companies and organizations were involved in the creation of SAML 2.0. In particular, and of special note, Liberty Alliance donated its Identity Federation Framework (ID-FF) specification to OASIS, which became the basis of the SAML 2.0 specification. Thus SAML 2.0 represents the convergence of SAML 1.1, Liberty ID-FF 1.2, and Shibboleth 1.3.

== SAML 2.0 assertions ==
An assertion is a package of information that supplies zero or more statements made by a SAML authority. SAML assertions are usually made about a subject, represented by the <Subject> element. The SAML 2.0 specification defines three different kinds of assertion statements that can be created by a SAML authority. All SAML-defined statements are associated with a subject. The three kinds of assertion statements are defined as follows:

- Authentication Statement: The assertion subject was authenticated by a particular means at a particular time.
- Attribute Statement: The assertion subject is associated with the supplied attributes.
- Authorization Decision Statement: A request to allow the assertion subject to access the specified resource has been granted or denied.

An important type of SAML assertion is the so-called "bearer" assertion used to facilitate Web Browser SSO. Here is an example of a short-lived bearer assertion issued by an identity provider (https://idp.example.org/SAML2) to a service provider (https://sp.example.com/SAML2). The assertion includes both an Authentication Assertion <saml:AuthnStatement> and an Attribute Assertion <saml:AttributeStatement>, which presumably the service provider uses to make an access control decision. The prefix saml: represents the SAML V2.0 assertion namespace.

=== Example of SAML ===
<saml:Assertion
   xmlns:saml="urn:oasis:names:tc:SAML:2.0:assertion"
   xmlns:xs="http://www.w3.org/2001/XMLSchema"
   ID="_d71a3a8e9fcc45c9e9d248ef7049393fc8f04e5f75"
   Version="2.0"
   IssueInstant="2004-12-05T09:22:05Z">
   <saml:Issuer>https://idp.example.org/SAML2</saml:Issuer>
   <ds:Signature
     xmlns:ds="http://www.w3.org/2000/09/xmldsig#">...</ds:Signature>
   <saml:Subject>
     <saml:NameID
       Format="urn:oasis:names:tc:SAML:2.0:nameid-format:transient">
       3f7b3dcf-1674-4ecd-92c8-1544f346baf8
     </saml:NameID>
     <saml:SubjectConfirmation
       Method="urn:oasis:names:tc:SAML:2.0:cm:bearer">
       <saml:SubjectConfirmationData
         InResponseTo="aaf23196-1773-2113-474a-fe114412ab72"
         Recipient="https://sp.example.com/SAML2/SSO/POST"
         NotOnOrAfter="2004-12-05T09:27:05Z"/>
     </saml:SubjectConfirmation>
   </saml:Subject>
   <saml:Conditions
     NotBefore="2004-12-05T09:17:05Z"
     NotOnOrAfter="2004-12-05T09:27:05Z">
     <saml:AudienceRestriction>
       <saml:Audience>https://sp.example.com/SAML2</saml:Audience>
     </saml:AudienceRestriction>
   </saml:Conditions>
   <saml:AuthnStatement
     AuthnInstant="2004-12-05T09:22:00Z"
     SessionIndex="b07b804c-7c29-ea16-7300-4f3d6f7928ac">
     <saml:AuthnContext>
       <saml:AuthnContextClassRef>
         urn:oasis:names:tc:SAML:2.0:ac:classes:PasswordProtectedTransport
       </saml:AuthnContextClassRef>
     </saml:AuthnContext>
   </saml:AuthnStatement>
   <saml:AttributeStatement>
     <saml:Attribute
       xmlns:x500="urn:oasis:names:tc:SAML:2.0:profiles:attribute:X500"
       x500:Encoding="LDAP"
       NameFormat="urn:oasis:names:tc:SAML:2.0:attrname-format:uri"
       Name="urn:oid:1.3.6.1.4.1.5923.1.1.1.1"
       FriendlyName="eduPersonAffiliation">
       <saml:AttributeValue
         xsi:type="xs:string">member</saml:AttributeValue>
       <saml:AttributeValue
         xsi:type="xs:string">staff</saml:AttributeValue>
     </saml:Attribute>
   </saml:AttributeStatement>
 </saml:Assertion>

Note that in the above example the <saml:Assertion> element contains the following child elements:

- a <saml:Issuer> element, which contains the unique identifier of the identity provider
- a <ds:Signature> element, which contains an integrity-preserving digital signature (not shown) over the <saml:Assertion> element
- a <saml:Subject> element, which identifies the authenticated principal (but in this case the identity of the principal is hidden behind an opaque transient identifier, for reasons of privacy)
- a <saml:Conditions> element, which gives the conditions under which the assertion is to be considered valid
- a <saml:AuthnStatement> element, which describes the act of authentication at the identity provider
- a <saml:AttributeStatement> element, which asserts a multi-valued attribute associated with the authenticated principal

In words, the assertion encodes the following information:

The assertion ("b07b804c-7c29-ea16-7300-4f3d6f7928ac") was issued at time "2004-12-05T09:22:05Z" by identity provider (https://idp.example.org/SAML2) regarding subject (3f7b3dcf-1674-4ecd-92c8-1544f346baf8) exclusively for service provider (https://sp.example.com/SAML2).

The authentication statement, in particular, asserts the following:

The principal identified in the <saml:Subject> element was authenticated at time "2004-12-05T09:22:00Z" by means of a password sent over a protected channel.

Likewise the attribute statement asserts that:

The principal identified in the <saml:Subject> element has the 'staff' and 'member' attributes at this institution.

== SAML 2.0 protocols ==
The following protocols are specified in SAMLCore:

- Assertion Query and Request Protocol
- Authentication Request Protocol
- Artifact Resolution Protocol
- Name Identifier Management Protocol
- Single Logout Protocol
- Name Identifier Mapping Protocol

The most important of these protocols—the Authentication Request Protocol—is discussed in detail below.

=== Authentication Request Protocol ===
In SAML 1.1 Web Browser SSO Profiles are initiated by the Identity Provider (IDP), that is, an unsolicited <samlp:Response> element is transmitted from the identity provider to the service provider (via the browser). (The prefix samlp: denotes the SAML protocol namespace.)

In SAML 2.0, however, the flow begins at the service provider who issues an explicit authentication request to the identity provider. The resulting Authentication Request Protocol is a significant new feature of SAML 2.0.

When a principal (or an entity acting on the principal's behalf) wishes to obtain an assertion containing an authentication statement, a <samlp:AuthnRequest> element is transmitted to the identity provider:

  <samlp:AuthnRequest
    xmlns:samlp="urn:oasis:names:tc:SAML:2.0:protocol"
    xmlns:saml="urn:oasis:names:tc:SAML:2.0:assertion"
    ID="aaf23196-1773-2113-474a-fe114412ab72"
    Version="2.0"
    IssueInstant="2004-12-05T09:21:59Z"
    AssertionConsumerServiceIndex="0"
    AttributeConsumingServiceIndex="0">
    <saml:Issuer>https://sp.example.com/SAML2</saml:Issuer>
    <samlp:NameIDPolicy
      AllowCreate="true"
      Format="urn:oasis:names:tc:SAML:2.0:nameid-format:transient"/>
  </samlp:AuthnRequest>

The above <samlp:AuthnRequest> element, which implicitly requests an assertion containing an authentication statement, was evidently issued by a service provider (https://sp.example.com/SAML2) and subsequently presented to the identity provider (via the browser). The identity provider authenticates the principal (if necessary) and issues an authentication response, which is transmitted back to the service provider (again via the browser).

=== Artifact Resolution Protocol ===
A SAML message is transmitted from one entity to another either by value or by reference. A reference to a SAML message is called an artifact. The receiver of an artifact resolves the reference by sending a <samlp:ArtifactResolve> request directly to the issuer of the artifact, who then responds with the actual message referenced by the artifact.

Suppose, for example, that an identity provider sends the following <samlp:ArtifactResolve> request directly to a service provider (via a back channel):

  <samlp:ArtifactResolve
 xmlns:samlp="urn:oasis:names:tc:SAML:2.0:protocol"
  xmlns:saml="urn:oasis:names:tc:SAML:2.0:assertion"
    ID="_cce4ee769ed970b501d680f697989d14"
    Version="2.0"
    IssueInstant="2004-12-05T09:21:58Z">
    <saml:Issuer>https://idp.example.org/SAML2</saml:Issuer>
    <!-- an ArtifactResolve message SHOULD be signed -->
    <ds:Signature
      xmlns:ds="http://www.w3.org/2000/09/xmldsig#">...</ds:Signature>
    <samlp:Artifact>AAQAAMh48/1oXIM+sDo7Dh2qMp1HM4IF5DaRNmDj6RdUmllwn9jJHyEgIi8=</samlp:Artifact>
  </samlp:ArtifactResolve>

In response, the service provider returns the SAML element referenced by the enclosed artifact. This protocol forms the basis of the HTTP Artifact Binding.

== SAML 2.0 bindings ==
The bindings supported by SAML 2.0 are outlined in the Bindings specification (SAMLBind):

- SAML SOAP Binding (based on SOAP 1.1)
- Reverse SOAP (PAOS) Binding
- HTTP Redirect Binding
- HTTP POST Binding
- HTTP Artifact Binding
- SAML URI Binding

For Web Browser SSO, the HTTP Redirect Binding and the HTTP POST Binding are commonly used. For example, the service provider may use HTTP Redirect to send a request while the identity provider uses HTTP POST to transmit the response. This example illustrates that an entity's choice of binding is independent of its partner's choice of binding.

=== HTTP Redirect Binding ===
SAML protocol messages can be carried directly in the URL query string of an HTTP GET request. Since the length of URLs is limited in practice, the HTTP Redirect binding is suitable for short messages, such as the <samlp:AuthnRequest> message. Longer messages (e.g. those containing signed or encrypted SAML assertions, such as SAML Responses) are usually transmitted via other bindings such as the HTTP POST Binding.

SAML requests or responses transmitted via HTTP Redirect have a SAMLRequest or SAMLResponse query string parameter, respectively. Before it's sent, the message is deflated (without header and checksum), base64-encoded, and URL-encoded, in that order. Upon receipt, the process is reversed to recover the original message.

For example, encoding the <samlp:AuthnRequest> message above yields:

 https://idp.example.org/SAML2/SSO/Redirect?SAMLRequest=fZFfa8IwFMXfBb9DyXvaJtZ1BqsURRC2
 Mabbw95ivc5Am3TJrXPffmmLY3%2FA15Pzuyf33On8XJXBCaxTRmeEhTEJQBdmr%2FRbRp63K3pL5rPhYOpkVdY
 ib%2FCon%2BC9AYfDQRB4WDvRvWWksVoY6ZQTWlbgBBZik9%2FfCR7GorYGTWFK8pu6DknnwKL%2FWEetlxmR8s
 BHbHJDWZqOKGdsRJM0kfQAjCUJ43KX8s78ctnIz%2Blp5xpYa4dSo1fjOKGM03i8jSeCMzGevHa2%2FBK5MNo1F
 dgN2JMqPLmHc0b6WTmiVbsGoTf5qv66Zq2t60x0wXZ2RKydiCJXh3CWVV1CWJgqanfl0%2Bin8xutxYOvZL18NK
 UqPlvZR5el%2BVhYkAgZQdsA6fWVsZXE63W2itrTQ2cVaKV2CjSSqL1v9P%2FAXv4C

The above message (formatted for readability) may be signed for additional security. In practice, all the data contained in a <samlp:AuthnRequest>, such as Issuer which contains the SP ID, and NameIDPolicy, has been agreed between IdP and SP beforehand (via manual information exchange or via SAML metadata). In that case signing the request is not a security constraint. When the <samlp:AuthnRequest> contains information not known by the IdP beforehand, such as Assertion Consumer Service URL, signing the request is recommended for security purposes.

=== HTTP POST Binding ===
In the following example, both the service provider and the identity provider use an HTTP POST binding. Initially, the service provider responds to a request from the user agent with a document containing an XHTML form:

  <form method="post" action="https://idp.example.org/SAML2/SSO/POST" ...>
    <input type="hidden" name="SAMLRequest" value="''request''" />
    ... other input parameter....
  </form>

The value of the SAMLRequest parameter is the base64-encoding of a <samlp:AuthnRequest> element, which is transmitted to the identity provider via the browser. The SSO service at the identity provider validates the request and responds with a document containing another XHTML form:

  <form method="post" action="https://sp.example.com/SAML2/SSO/POST" ...>
    <input type="hidden" name="SAMLResponse" value="''response''" />
    ...
  </form>

The value of the SAMLResponse parameter is the base64 encoding of a <samlp:Response> element, which likewise is transmitted to the service provider via the browser.

To automate the submission of the form, the following line of JavaScript may appear anywhere on the XHTML page:

  window.onload = function () { document.forms[0].submit(); }

This assumes, of course, that the first form element in the page contains the above SAMLResponse containing form element (forms[0]).

=== HTTP Artifact Binding ===
The HTTP Artifact Binding uses the Artifact Resolution Protocol and the SAML SOAP Binding (over HTTP) to resolve a SAML message by reference. Consider the following specific example. Suppose a service provider wants to send a <samlp:AuthnRequest> message to an identity provider. Initially, the service provider transmits an artifact to the identity provider via an HTTP redirect:

 https://idp.example.org/SAML2/SSO/Artifact?SAMLart=artifact

Next the identity provider sends a <samlp:ArtifactResolve> request (such as the ArtifactResolveRequest shown earlier) directly to the service provider via a back channel. Finally, the service provider returns a <samlp:ArtifactResponse> element containing the referenced <samlp:AuthnRequest> message:

  <samlp:ArtifactResponse
    xmlns:samlp="urn:oasis:names:tc:SAML:2.0:protocol"
    ID="_d84a49e5958803dedcff4c984c2b0d95"
    InResponseTo="_cce4ee769ed970b501d680f697989d14"
    Version="2.0"
    IssueInstant="2004-12-05T09:21:59Z">
    <!-- an ArtifactResponse message SHOULD be signed -->
    <ds:Signature
      xmlns:ds="http://www.w3.org/2000/09/xmldsig#">...</ds:Signature>
    <samlp:Status>
      <samlp:StatusCode
        Value="urn:oasis:names:tc:SAML:2.0:status:Success"/>
    </samlp:Status>
    <samlp:AuthnRequest
      xmlns:samlp="urn:oasis:names:tc:SAML:2.0:protocol"
      xmlns:saml="urn:oasis:names:tc:SAML:2.0:assertion"
      ID="_306f8ec5b618f361c70b6ffb1480eade"
      Version="2.0"
      IssueInstant="2004-12-05T09:21:59Z"
      Destination="https://idp.example.org/SAML2/SSO/Artifact"
      ProtocolBinding="urn:oasis:names:tc:SAML:2.0:bindings:HTTP-Artifact"
      AssertionConsumerServiceURL="https://sp.example.com/SAML2/SSO/Artifact">
      <saml:Issuer>https://sp.example.com/SAML2</saml:Issuer>
      <samlp:NameIDPolicy
        AllowCreate="false"
        Format="urn:oasis:names:tc:SAML:1.1:nameid-format:emailAddress"/>
    </samlp:AuthnRequest>
  </samlp:ArtifactResponse>

Of course the flow can go in the other direction as well, that is, the identity provider may issue an artifact, and in fact this is more common. See, for example, the "double artifact" profile example later in this topic.

==== Artifact format ====
In general, a SAML 2.0 artifact is defined as follows (SAMLBind):

 SAML_artifact := B64 (TypeCode EndpointIndex RemainingArtifact)
 TypeCode      := Byte1Byte2
 EndpointIndex := Byte1Byte2

Thus a SAML 2.0 artifact consists of three components: a two-byte TypeCode, a two-byte EndpointIndex, and an arbitrary sequence of bytes called the RemainingArtifact. These three pieces of information are concatenated and base64-encoded to yield the complete artifact.

The TypeCode uniquely identifies the artifact format. SAML 2.0 predefines just one such artifact, of type 0x0004. The EndpointIndex is a reference to a particular artifact resolution endpoint managed by the artifact issuer (which may be either the IdP or the SP, as mentioned earlier). The RemainingArtifact, which is determined by the type definition, is the "meat" of the artifact.

The format of a type 0x0004 artifact is further defined as follows:

 TypeCode            := 0x0004
 RemainingArtifact   := SourceId MessageHandle
 SourceId            := 20-byte_sequence
 MessageHandle       := 20-byte_sequence

Thus a type 0x0004 artifact is of size 44 bytes (unencoded). The SourceId is an arbitrary sequence of bytes, although in practice, the SourceId is the SHA-1 hash of the issuer's entityID. The MessageHandle is a random sequence of bytes that references a SAML message that the artifact issuer is willing to produce on-demand.

For example, consider this hex-encoded type 0x0004 artifact:

 00040000c878f3fd685c833eb03a3b0e1daa329d47338205e436913660e3e917549a59709fd8c91f2120222f

If you look closely, you can see the TypeCode (0x0004) and the EndpointIndex (0x0000) at the front of the artifact. The next 20 bytes are the SHA-1 hash of the issuer's entityID (https://idp.example.org/SAML2) followed by 20 random bytes. The base64-encoding of these 44 bytes is what you see in the ArtifactResolveRequest example above.

== SAML 2.0 profiles ==
In SAML 2.0, as in SAML 1.1, the primary use case is still Web Browser SSO, but the scope of SAML 2.0 is broader than previous versions of SAML, as suggested in the following exhaustive list of profiles:

- SSO Profiles
  - Web browser SSO profile
  - Enhanced Client or Proxy (ECP) Profile
  - Identity Provider Discovery Profile
  - Single Logout Profile
  - Name Identifier Management Profile
- Artifact Resolution Profile
- Assertion Query/Request Profile
- Name Identifier Mapping Profile
- SAML Attribute Profiles
  - Basic Attribute Profile
  - X.500/LDAP Attribute Profile
  - UUID Attribute Profile
  - DCE PAC Attribute Profile
  - XACML Attribute Profile

Although the number of supported profiles is quite large, the Profiles specification (SAMLProf) is simplified since the binding aspects of each profile have been factored out into a separate Bindings specification (SAMLBind).

=== Web browser SSO profile ===
SAML 2.0 specifies a Web Browser SSO Profile involving an identity provider (IdP), a service provider (SP), and a principal wielding an HTTP user agent. The service provider has four bindings from which to choose while the identity provider has three, which leads to twelve possible deployment scenarios. We outline three of those deployment scenarios below.

==== SP redirect request; IdP POST response ====
This is one of the most common scenarios. The service provider sends a SAML Request to the IdP SSO Service using the HTTP-Redirect Binding. The identity provider returns the SAML Response to the SP Assertion Consumer Service using the HTTP-POST Binding.

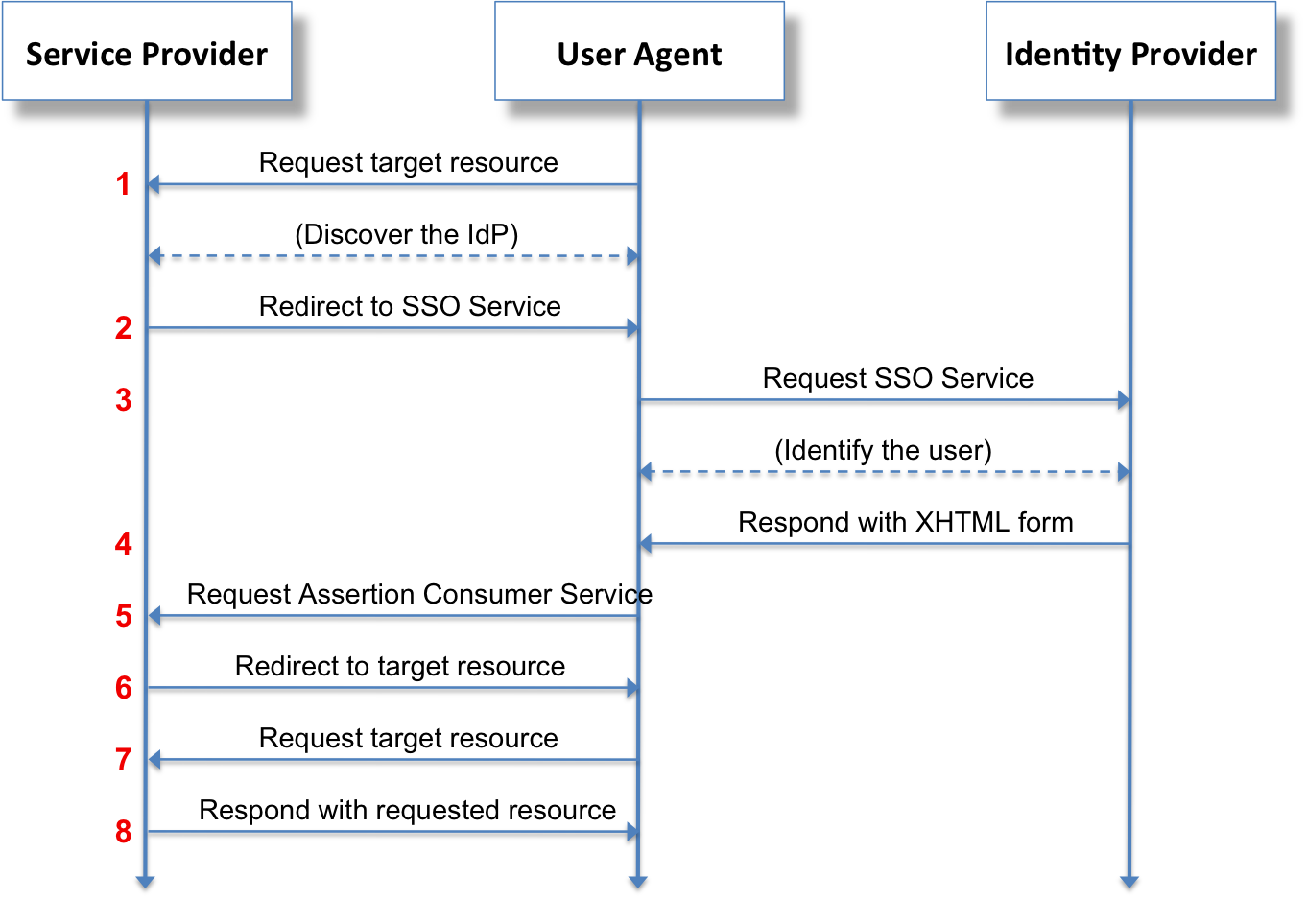
SAML 2.0 Web Browser SSO (SP Redirect Bind/ IdP POST Response)

The message flow begins with a request for a secured resource at the service provider.

1. Request the target resource at the SP

The principal (via an HTTP user agent) requests a target resource at the service provider:

 https://sp.example.com/myresource

The service provider performs a security check on behalf of the target resource. If a valid security context at the service provider already exists, skip steps 2–7.

The service provider may use any kind of mechanism to discover the identity provider that will be used, e.g., ask the user, use a preconfigured IdP, etc.

2. Redirect to IdP SSO Service

The service provider generates an appropriate SAMLRequest (and RelayState, if any), then redirects the browser to the IdP SSO Service using a standard HTTP 302 redirect.

302 Redirect
Location: https://idp.example.org/SAML2/SSO/Redirect?SAMLRequest=request&RelayState=token

The RelayState token is an opaque reference to state information maintained at the service provider. The value of the SAMLRequest parameter is a deflated, base64-encoded and URL-encoded value of an <samlp:AuthnRequest> element:

  <samlp:AuthnRequest
    xmlns:samlp="urn:oasis:names:tc:SAML:2.0:protocol"
    xmlns:saml="urn:oasis:names:tc:SAML:2.0:assertion"
    ID="identifier_1"
    Version="2.0"
    IssueInstant="2004-12-05T09:21:59Z"
    AssertionConsumerServiceIndex="0">
    <saml:Issuer>https://sp.example.com/SAML2</saml:Issuer>
    <samlp:NameIDPolicy
      AllowCreate="true"
      Format="urn:oasis:names:tc:SAML:2.0:nameid-format:transient"/>
  </samlp:AuthnRequest>

The SAMLRequest may be signed using the SP signing key. Typically, however, this is not necessary.

3. Request the SSO Service at the IdP

The user agent issues a GET request to the SSO service at the identity provider:

GET /SAML2/SSO/Redirect?SAMLRequest=request&RelayState=token HTTP/1.1
Host: idp.example.org

where the values of the SAMLRequest and RelayState parameters are the same as those provided in the redirect. The SSO Service at the identity provider processes the <samlp:AuthnRequest> element (by URL-decoding, base64-decoding and inflating the request, in that order) and performs a security check. If the user does not have a valid security context, the identity provider identifies the user with any mechanism (details omitted).

4. Respond with an XHTML form

The SSO Service validates the request and responds with a document containing an XHTML form:

  <form method="post" action="https://sp.example.com/SAML2/SSO/POST" ...>
    <input type="hidden" name="SAMLResponse" value="response" />
    <input type="hidden" name="RelayState" value="token" />
    ...
    <input type="submit" value="Submit" />
  </form>

The value of the RelayState parameter has been preserved from step 3. The value of the SAMLResponse parameter is the base64 encoding of the following <samlp:Response> element:

  <samlp:Response
    xmlns:samlp="urn:oasis:names:tc:SAML:2.0:protocol"
    xmlns:saml="urn:oasis:names:tc:SAML:2.0:assertion"
    ID="identifier_2"
    InResponseTo="identifier_1"
    Version="2.0"
    IssueInstant="2004-12-05T09:22:05Z"
    Destination="https://sp.example.com/SAML2/SSO/POST">
    <saml:Issuer>https://idp.example.org/SAML2</saml:Issuer>
    <samlp:Status>
      <samlp:StatusCode
        Value="urn:oasis:names:tc:SAML:2.0:status:Success"/>
    </samlp:Status>
    <saml:Assertion
      xmlns:saml="urn:oasis:names:tc:SAML:2.0:assertion"
      ID="identifier_3"
      Version="2.0"
      IssueInstant="2004-12-05T09:22:05Z">
      <saml:Issuer>https://idp.example.org/SAML2</saml:Issuer>
      <!-- a POSTed assertion MUST be signed -->
      <ds:Signature
        xmlns:ds="http://www.w3.org/2000/09/xmldsig#">...</ds:Signature>
      <saml:Subject>
        <saml:NameID
          Format="urn:oasis:names:tc:SAML:2.0:nameid-format:transient">
          3f7b3dcf-1674-4ecd-92c8-1544f346baf8
        </saml:NameID>
        <saml:SubjectConfirmation
          Method="urn:oasis:names:tc:SAML:2.0:cm:bearer">
          <saml:SubjectConfirmationData
            InResponseTo="identifier_1"
            Recipient="https://sp.example.com/SAML2/SSO/POST"
            NotOnOrAfter="2004-12-05T09:27:05Z"/>
        </saml:SubjectConfirmation>
      </saml:Subject>
      <saml:Conditions
        NotBefore="2004-12-05T09:17:05Z"
        NotOnOrAfter="2004-12-05T09:27:05Z">
        <saml:AudienceRestriction>
          <saml:Audience>https://sp.example.com/SAML2</saml:Audience>
        </saml:AudienceRestriction>
      </saml:Conditions>
      <saml:AuthnStatement
        AuthnInstant="2004-12-05T09:22:00Z"
        SessionIndex="identifier_3">
        <saml:AuthnContext>
          <saml:AuthnContextClassRef>
            urn:oasis:names:tc:SAML:2.0:ac:classes:PasswordProtectedTransport
         </saml:AuthnContextClassRef>
        </saml:AuthnContext>
      </saml:AuthnStatement>
    </saml:Assertion>
  </samlp:Response>

5. Request the Assertion Consumer Service at the SP

The user agent issues a POST request to the Assertion Consumer Service at the service provider:

POST /SAML2/SSO/POST HTTP/1.1
Host: sp.example.com
Content-Type: application/x-www-form-urlencoded
Content-Length: nnn
 
SAMLResponse=response&RelayState=token

where the values of the SAMLResponse and RelayState parameters are taken from the XHTML form at step 4.

6. Redirect to the target resource

The assertion consumer service processes the response, creates a security context at the service provider and redirects the user agent to the target resource.

7. Request the target resource at the SP again

The user agent requests the target resource at the service provider (again):

 https://sp.example.com/myresource

8. Respond with requested resource

Since a security context exists, the service provider returns the resource to the user agent.

==== SP POST Request; IdP POST Response ====
This is a relatively simple deployment of the SAML 2.0 Web Browser SSO Profile (SAMLProf) where both the service provider (SP) and the identity provider (IdP) use the HTTP POST binding.

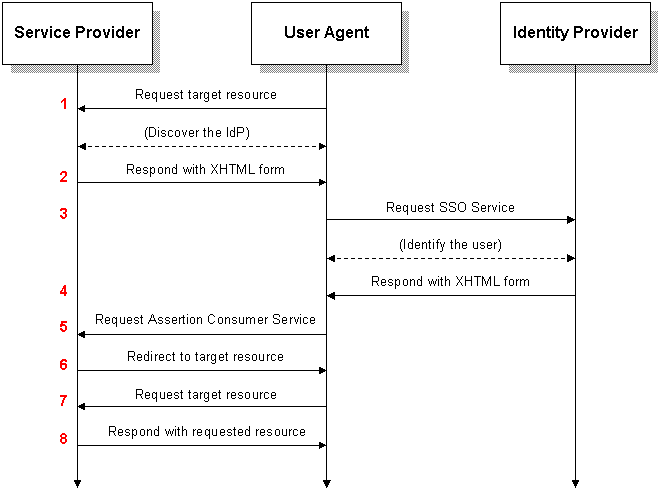
SAML 2.0 Web Browser SSO (POST)

The message flow begins with a request for a secured resource at the SP.

1. Request the target resource at the SP

The principal (via an HTTP user agent) requests a target resource at the service provider:

 https://sp.example.com/myresource

The service provider performs a security check on behalf of the target resource. If a valid security context at the service provider already exists, skip steps 2–7.

2. Respond with an XHTML form

The service provider responds with a document containing an XHTML form:

  <form method="post" action="https://idp.example.org/SAML2/SSO/POST" ...>
    <input type="hidden" name="SAMLRequest" value="request" />
    <input type="hidden" name="RelayState" value="token" />
    ...
    <input type="submit" value="Submit" />
  </form>

The RelayState token is an opaque reference to state information maintained at the service provider. The value of the SAMLRequest parameter is the base64 encoding of the following <samlp:AuthnRequest> element:

  <samlp:AuthnRequest
    xmlns:samlp="urn:oasis:names:tc:SAML:2.0:protocol"
    xmlns:saml="urn:oasis:names:tc:SAML:2.0:assertion"
    ID="identifier_1"
    Version="2.0"
    IssueInstant="2004-12-05T09:21:59Z"
    AssertionConsumerServiceIndex="0">
    <saml:Issuer>https://sp.example.com/SAML2</saml:Issuer>
    <samlp:NameIDPolicy
      AllowCreate="true"
      Format="urn:oasis:names:tc:SAML:2.0:nameid-format:transient"/>
  </samlp:AuthnRequest>

Before the <samlp:AuthnRequest> element is inserted into the XHTML form, it is first base64-encoded.

3. Request the SSO Service at the IdP

The user agent issues a POST request to the SSO service at the identity provider:

POST /SAML2/SSO/POST HTTP/1.1
Host: idp.example.org
Content-Type: application/x-www-form-urlencoded
Content-Length: nnn

SAMLRequest=request&RelayState=token

where the values of the SAMLRequest and RelayState parameters are taken from the XHTML form at step 2. The SSO service processes the <samlp:AuthnRequest> element (by URL-decoding, base64-decoding and inflating the request, in that order) and performs a security check. If the user does not have a valid security context, the identity provider identifies the user (details omitted).

4. Respond with an XHTML form

The SSO service validates the request and responds with a document containing an XHTML form:

  <form method="post" action="https://sp.example.com/SAML2/SSO/POST" ...>
    <input type="hidden" name="SAMLResponse" value="response" />
    <input type="hidden" name="RelayState" value="token" />
    ...
    <input type="submit" value="Submit" />
  </form>

The value of the RelayState parameter has been preserved from step 3. The value of the SAMLResponse parameter is the base64 encoding of the following <samlp:Response> element:

  <samlp:Response
    xmlns:samlp="urn:oasis:names:tc:SAML:2.0:protocol"
    xmlns:saml="urn:oasis:names:tc:SAML:2.0:assertion"
    ID="identifier_2"
    InResponseTo="identifier_1"
    Version="2.0"
    IssueInstant="2004-12-05T09:22:05Z"
    Destination="https://sp.example.com/SAML2/SSO/POST">
    <saml:Issuer>https://idp.example.org/SAML2</saml:Issuer>
    <samlp:Status>
      <samlp:StatusCode
        Value="urn:oasis:names:tc:SAML:2.0:status:Success"/>
    </samlp:Status>
    <saml:Assertion
      xmlns:saml="urn:oasis:names:tc:SAML:2.0:assertion"
      ID="identifier_3"
      Version="2.0"
      IssueInstant="2004-12-05T09:22:05Z">
      <saml:Issuer>https://idp.example.org/SAML2</saml:Issuer>
      <!-- a POSTed assertion MUST be signed -->
      <ds:Signature
        xmlns:ds="http://www.w3.org/2000/09/xmldsig#">...</ds:Signature>
      <saml:Subject>
        <saml:NameID
          Format="urn:oasis:names:tc:SAML:2.0:nameid-format:transient">
          3f7b3dcf-1674-4ecd-92c8-1544f346baf8
        </saml:NameID>
        <saml:SubjectConfirmation
          Method="urn:oasis:names:tc:SAML:2.0:cm:bearer">
          <saml:SubjectConfirmationData
            InResponseTo="identifier_1"
            Recipient="https://sp.example.com/SAML2/SSO/POST"
            NotOnOrAfter="2004-12-05T09:27:05Z"/>
        </saml:SubjectConfirmation>
      </saml:Subject>
      <saml:Conditions
        NotBefore="2004-12-05T09:17:05Z"
        NotOnOrAfter="2004-12-05T09:27:05Z">
        <saml:AudienceRestriction>
          <saml:Audience>https://sp.example.com/SAML2</saml:Audience>
        </saml:AudienceRestriction>
      </saml:Conditions>
      <saml:AuthnStatement
        AuthnInstant="2004-12-05T09:22:00Z"
        SessionIndex="identifier_3">
        <saml:AuthnContext>
          <saml:AuthnContextClassRef>
            urn:oasis:names:tc:SAML:2.0:ac:classes:PasswordProtectedTransport
         </saml:AuthnContextClassRef>
        </saml:AuthnContext>
      </saml:AuthnStatement>
    </saml:Assertion>
  </samlp:Response>

5. Request the Assertion Consumer Service at the SP

The user agent issues a POST request to the assertion consumer service at the service provider:

POST /SAML2/SSO/POST HTTP/1.1
Host: sp.example.com
Content-Type: application/x-www-form-urlencoded
Content-Length: nnn
 
SAMLResponse=response&RelayState=token

where the values of the SAMLResponse and RelayState parameters are taken from the XHTML form at step 4.

6. Redirect to the target resource

The assertion consumer service processes the response, creates a security context at the service provider and redirects the user agent to the target resource.

7. Request the target resource at the SP again

The user agent requests the target resource at the service provider (again):

 https://sp.example.com/myresource

8. Respond with requested resource

Since a security context exists, the service provider returns the resource to the user agent.

==== SP redirect artifact; IdP redirect artifact ====
This is a complex deployment of the SAML 2.0 Web Browser SSO Profile (SAMLProf) where both the service provider (SP) and the identity provider (IdP) use the HTTP Artifact binding. Both artifacts are delivered to their respective endpoints via HTTP GET.

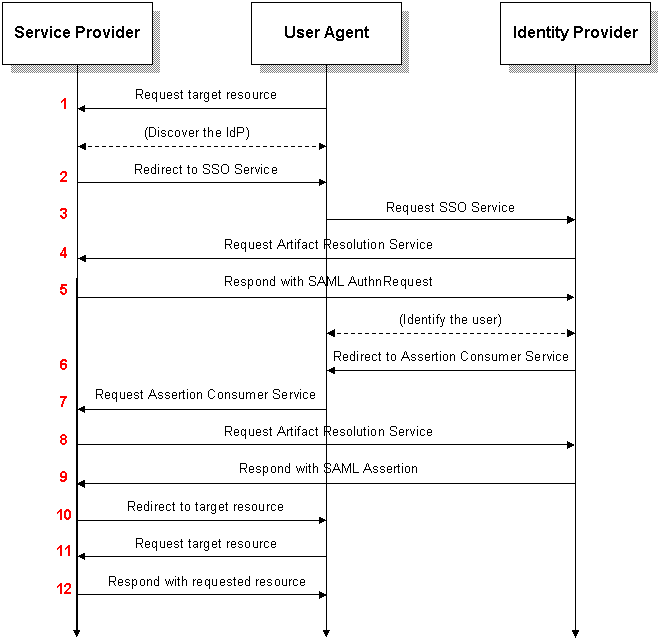
SAML 2.0 Web Browser SSO (Artifact)

The message flow begins with a request for a secured resource at the SP:

1. Request the target resource at the SP

The principal (via an HTTP user agent) requests a target resource at the service provider:

 https://sp.example.com/myresource

The service provider performs a security check on behalf of the target resource. If a valid security context at the service provider already exists, skip steps 2–11.

2. Redirect to the Single Sign-on (SSO) Service at the IdP

The service provider redirects the user agent to the single sign-on (SSO) service at the identity provider. A RelayState parameter and a SAMLart parameter are appended to the redirect URL.

3. Request the SSO Service at the IdP

The user agent requests the SSO service at the identity provider:

 https://idp.example.org/SAML2/SSO/Artifact?SAMLart=artifact_1&RelayState=token

where token is an opaque reference to state information maintained at the service provider and artifact_1 is a SAML artifact, both issued at step 2.

4. Request the Artifact Resolution Service at the SP

The SSO service dereferences the artifact by sending a <samlp:ArtifactResolve> element bound to a SAML SOAP message to the artifact resolution service at the service provider:

  <samlp:ArtifactResolve
    xmlns:samlp="urn:oasis:names:tc:SAML:2.0:protocol"
    xmlns:saml="urn:oasis:names:tc:SAML:2.0:assertion"
    ID="identifier_1"
    Version="2.0"
    IssueInstant="2004-12-05T09:21:58Z"
    Destination="https://sp.example.com/SAML2/ArtifactResolution">
    <saml:Issuer>https://idp.example.org/SAML2</saml:Issuer>
    <!-- an ArtifactResolve message SHOULD be signed -->
    <ds:Signature
      xmlns:ds="http://www.w3.org/2000/09/xmldsig#">...</ds:Signature>
    <samlp:Artifact>''artifact_1''</samlp:Artifact>
  </samlp:ArtifactResolve>

where the value of the <samlp:Artifact> element is the SAML artifact transmitted at step 3.

5. Respond with a SAML AuthnRequest

The artifact resolution service at the service provider returns a <samlp:ArtifactResponse> element (containing an <samlp:AuthnRequest> element) bound to a SAML SOAP message to the SSO service at the identity provider:

  <samlp:ArtifactResponse
    xmlns:samlp="urn:oasis:names:tc:SAML:2.0:protocol"
    ID="identifier_2"
    InResponseTo="identifier_1"
    Version="2.0"
    IssueInstant="2004-12-05T09:21:59Z">
    <!-- an ArtifactResponse message SHOULD be signed -->
    <ds:Signature
      xmlns:ds="http://www.w3.org/2000/09/xmldsig#">...</ds:Signature>
    <samlp:Status>
      <samlp:StatusCode
        Value="urn:oasis:names:tc:SAML:2.0:status:Success"/>
    </samlp:Status>
    <samlp:AuthnRequest
      xmlns:samlp="urn:oasis:names:tc:SAML:2.0:protocol"
      xmlns:saml="urn:oasis:names:tc:SAML:2.0:assertion"
      ID="identifier_3"
      Version="2.0"
      IssueInstant="2004-12-05T09:21:59Z"
      Destination="https://idp.example.org/SAML2/SSO/Artifact"
      ProtocolBinding="urn:oasis:names:tc:SAML:2.0:bindings:HTTP-Artifact"
      AssertionConsumerServiceURL="https://sp.example.com/SAML2/SSO/Artifact">
      <saml:Issuer>https://sp.example.com/SAML2</saml:Issuer>
      <samlp:NameIDPolicy
        AllowCreate="false"
        Format="urn:oasis:names:tc:SAML:1.1:nameid-format:emailAddress"/>
    </samlp:AuthnRequest>
  </samlp:ArtifactResponse>

The SSO service processes the <samlp:AuthnRequest> element and performs a security check. If the user does not have a valid security context, the identity provider identifies the user (details omitted).

6. Redirect to the Assertion Consumer Service

The SSO service at the identity provider redirects the user agent to the assertion consumer service at the service provider. The previous RelayState parameter and a new SAMLart parameter are appended to the redirect URL.

7. Request the Assertion Consumer Service at the SP

The user agent requests the assertion consumer service at the service provider:

 https://sp.example.com/SAML2/SSO/Artifact?SAMLart=artifact_2&RelayState=token

where token is the token value from step 3 and artifact_2 is the SAML artifact issued at step 6.

8. Request the Artifact Resolution Service at the IdP

The assertion consumer service dereferences the artifact by sending a <samlp:ArtifactResolve> element bound to a SAML SOAP message to the artifact resolution service at the identity provider:

  <samlp:ArtifactResolve
    xmlns:samlp="urn:oasis:names:tc:SAML:2.0:protocol"
    xmlns:saml="urn:oasis:names:tc:SAML:2.0:assertion"
    ID="identifier_4"
    Version="2.0"
    IssueInstant="2004-12-05T09:22:04Z"
    Destination="https://idp.example.org/SAML2/ArtifactResolution">
    <saml:Issuer>https://sp.example.com/SAML2</saml:Issuer>
    <!-- an ArtifactResolve message SHOULD be signed -->
    <ds:Signature
      xmlns:ds="http://www.w3.org/2000/09/xmldsig#">...</ds:Signature>
    <samlp:Artifact>''artifact_2''</samlp:Artifact>
  </samlp:ArtifactResolve>

where the value of the <samlp:Artifact> element is the SAML artifact transmitted at step 7.

9. Respond with a SAML Assertion

The artifact resolution service at the identity provider returns a <samlp:ArtifactResponse> element (containing an <samlp:Response> element) bound to a SAML SOAP message to the assertion consumer service at the service provider:

  <samlp:ArtifactResponse
    xmlns:samlp="urn:oasis:names:tc:SAML:2.0:protocol"
    ID="identifier_5"
    InResponseTo="identifier_4"
    Version="2.0"
    IssueInstant="2004-12-05T09:22:05Z">
    <!-- an ArtifactResponse message SHOULD be signed -->
    <ds:Signature
      xmlns:ds="http://www.w3.org/2000/09/xmldsig#">...</ds:Signature>
    <samlp:Status>
      <samlp:StatusCode
        Value="urn:oasis:names:tc:SAML:2.0:status:Success"/>
    </samlp:Status>
    <samlp:Response
      xmlns:samlp="urn:oasis:names:tc:SAML:2.0:protocol"
      xmlns:saml="urn:oasis:names:tc:SAML:2.0:assertion"
      ID="identifier_6"
      InResponseTo="identifier_3"
      Version="2.0"
      IssueInstant="2004-12-05T09:22:05Z"
      Destination="https://sp.example.com/SAML2/SSO/Artifact">
      <saml:Issuer>https://idp.example.org/SAML2</saml:Issuer>
      <ds:Signature
        xmlns:ds="http://www.w3.org/2000/09/xmldsig#">...</ds:Signature>
      <samlp:Status>
        <samlp:StatusCode
          Value="urn:oasis:names:tc:SAML:2.0:status:Success"/>
      </samlp:Status>
      <saml:Assertion
        xmlns:saml="urn:oasis:names:tc:SAML:2.0:assertion"
        ID="identifier_7"
        Version="2.0"
        IssueInstant="2004-12-05T09:22:05Z">
        <saml:Issuer>https://idp.example.org/SAML2</saml:Issuer>
        <!-- a Subject element is required -->
        <saml:Subject>
          <saml:NameID
            Format="urn:oasis:names:tc:SAML:1.1:nameid-format:emailAddress">
            user@mail.example.org
          </saml:NameID>
          <saml:SubjectConfirmation
            Method="urn:oasis:names:tc:SAML:2.0:cm:bearer">
            <saml:SubjectConfirmationData
              InResponseTo="identifier_3"
              Recipient="https://sp.example.com/SAML2/SSO/Artifact"
              NotOnOrAfter="2004-12-05T09:27:05Z"/>
          </saml:SubjectConfirmation>
        </saml:Subject>
        <saml:Conditions
          NotBefore="2004-12-05T09:17:05Z"
          NotOnOrAfter="2004-12-05T09:27:05Z">
          <saml:AudienceRestriction>
            <saml:Audience>https://sp.example.com/SAML2</saml:Audience>
          </saml:AudienceRestriction>
        </saml:Conditions>
        <saml:AuthnStatement
          AuthnInstant="2004-12-05T09:22:00Z"
          SessionIndex="identifier_7">
          <saml:AuthnContext>
            <saml:AuthnContextClassRef>
              urn:oasis:names:tc:SAML:2.0:ac:classes:PasswordProtectedTransport
           </saml:AuthnContextClassRef>
          </saml:AuthnContext>
        </saml:AuthnStatement>
      </saml:Assertion>
    </samlp:Response>
  </samlp:ArtifactResponse>

10. Redirect to the target resource

The assertion consumer service processes the response, creates a security context at the service provider and redirects the user agent to the target resource.

11. Request the target resource at the SP again

The user agent requests the target resource at the service provider (again):

 https://sp.example.com/myresource

12. Respond with the requested resource

Since a security context exists, the service provider returns the resource to the user agent.

=== Identity provider discovery profile ===
The SAML 2.0 Identity Provider Discovery Profile introduces the following concepts:

- Common Domain
- Common Domain Cookie
- Common Domain Cookie Writing Service
- Common Domain Cookie Reading Service

As a hypothetical example of a Common Domain, let's suppose Example UK (example.co.uk) and Example Deutschland (example.de) belong to the virtual organization Example Global Alliance (example.com). In this example, the domain example.com is the common domain. Both Example UK and Example Deutschland have a presence in this domain (uk.example.com and de.example.com, resp.).

The Common Domain Cookie is a secure browser cookie scoped to the common domain. For each browser user, this cookie stores a history list of recently visited IdPs. The name and value of the cookie are specified in the IdP Discovery Profile (SAMLProf).

After a successful act of authentication, the IdP requests the Common Domain Cookie Writing Service. This service appends the IdP's unique identifier to the common domain cookie. The SP, when it receives an unauthenticated request for a protected resource, requests the Common Domain Cookie Reading Service to discover the browser user's most recently used IdP.

=== Assertion query/request profile ===
The Assertion Query/Request Profile is a general profile that accommodates numerous types of so-called queries using the following SAML 2.0 elements:

- the <samlp:AssertionIDRequest> element, which is used to request an assertion given its unique identifier (ID)
- the <samlp:SubjectQuery> element, which is an abstract extension point that allows new subject-based SAML queries to be defined
- the <samlp:AuthnQuery> element, which is used to request existing authentication assertions about a given subject from an Authentication Authority
- the <samlp:AttributeQuery> element, which is used to request attributes about a given subject from an Attribute Authority
- the <samlp:AuthzDecisionQuery> element, which is used to request an authorization decision from a trusted third party

The SAML SOAP binding is often used in conjunction with queries.

==== SAML attribute query ====
The Attribute Query is perhaps the most important type of SAML query. Often a requester, acting on behalf of the principal, queries an identity provider for attributes. Below we give an example of a query issued by a principal directly:

  <samlp:AttributeQuery
    xmlns:saml="urn:oasis:names:tc:SAML:2.0:assertion"
    xmlns:samlp="urn:oasis:names:tc:SAML:2.0:protocol"
    ID="aaf23196-1773-2113-474a-fe114412ab72"
    Version="2.0"
    IssueInstant="2006-07-17T20:31:40Z">
    <saml:Issuer
      Format="urn:oasis:names:tc:SAML:1.1:nameid-format:X509SubjectName">
      CN=trscavo@example.com,OU=User,O=NCSA-TEST,C=US
    </saml:Issuer>
    <saml:Subject>
      <saml:NameID
        Format="urn:oasis:names:tc:SAML:1.1:nameid-format:X509SubjectName">
        CN=trscavo@example.com,OU=User,O=NCSA-TEST,C=US
      </saml:NameID>
    </saml:Subject>
    <saml:Attribute
      NameFormat="urn:oasis:names:tc:SAML:2.0:attrname-format:uri"
      Name="urn:oid:2.5.4.42"
      FriendlyName="givenName">
    </saml:Attribute>
    <saml:Attribute
      NameFormat="urn:oasis:names:tc:SAML:2.0:attrname-format:uri"
      Name="urn:oid:1.3.6.1.4.1.1466.115.121.1.26"
      FriendlyName="mail">
    </saml:Attribute>
  </samlp:AttributeQuery>

Note that the Issuer is the Subject in this case. This is sometimes called an attribute self-query. An identity provider might return the following assertion, wrapped in a <samlp:Response> element (not shown):

  <saml:Assertion
    xmlns:saml="urn:oasis:names:tc:SAML:2.0:assertion"
    xmlns:xs="http://www.w3.org/2001/XMLSchema"
    xmlns:xsi="http://www.w3.org/2001/XMLSchema-instance"
    xmlns:ds="http://www.w3.org/2000/09/xmldsig#"
    ID="_33776a319493ad607b7ab3e689482e45"
    Version="2.0"
    IssueInstant="2006-07-17T20:31:41Z">
    <saml:Issuer>https://idp.example.org/SAML2</saml:Issuer>
    <ds:Signature>...</ds:Signature>
    <saml:Subject>
      <saml:NameID
        Format="urn:oasis:names:tc:SAML:1.1:nameid-format:X509SubjectName">
        CN=trscavo@example.com,OU=User,O=NCSA-TEST,C=US
      </saml:NameID>
      <saml:SubjectConfirmation
        Method="urn:oasis:names:tc:SAML:2.0:cm:holder-of-key">
        <saml:SubjectConfirmationData>
          <ds:KeyInfo>
            <ds:X509Data>
              <!-- principal's X.509 cert -->
              <ds:X509Certificate>
  MIICiDCCAXACCQDE+9eiWrm62jANBgkqhkiG9w0BAQQFADBFMQswCQYDVQQGEwJV
  UzESMBAGA1UEChMJTkNTQS1URVNUMQ0wCwYDVQQLEwRVc2VyMRMwEQYDVQQDEwpT
  UC1TZXJ2aWNlMB4XDTA2MDcxNzIwMjE0MVoXDTA2MDcxODIwMjE0MVowSzELMAkG
  A1UEBhMCVVMxEjAQBgNVBAoTCU5DU0EtVEVTVDENMAsGA1UECxMEVXNlcjEZMBcG
  A1UEAwwQdHJzY2F2b0B1aXVjLmVkdTCBnzANBgkqhkiG9w0BAQEFAAOBjQAwgYkC
  gYEAv9QMe4lRl3XbWPcflbCjGK9gty6zBJmp+tsaJINM0VaBaZ3t+tSXknelYife
  nCc2O3yaX76aq53QMXy+5wKQYe8Rzdw28Nv3a73wfjXJXoUhGkvERcscs9EfIWcC
  g2bHOg8uSh+Fbv3lHih4lBJ5MCS2buJfsR7dlr/xsadU2RcCAwEAATANBgkqhkiG
  9w0BAQQFAAOCAQEAdyIcMTob7TVkelfJ7+I1j0LO24UlKvbLzd2OPvcFTCv6fVHx
  Ejk0QxaZXJhreZ6+rIdiMXrEzlRdJEsNMxtDW8++sVp6avoB5EX1y3ez+CEAIL4g
  cjvKZUR4dMryWshWIBHKFFul+r7urUgvWI12KbMeE9KP+kiiiiTskLcKgFzngw1J
  selmHhTcTCrcDocn5yO2+d3dog52vSOtVFDBsBuvDixO2hv679JR6Hlqjtk4GExp
  E9iVI0wdPE038uQIJJTXlhsMMLvUGVh/c0ReJBn92Vj4dI/yy6PtY/8ncYLYNkjg
  oVN0J/ymOktn9lTlFyTiuY4OuJsZRO1+zWLy9g==
              </ds:X509Certificate>
            </ds:X509Data>
          </ds:KeyInfo>
        </saml:SubjectConfirmationData>
      </saml:SubjectConfirmation>
    </saml:Subject>
    <!-- assertion lifetime constrained by principal's X.509 cert -->
    <saml:Conditions
      NotBefore="2006-07-17T20:31:41Z"
      NotOnOrAfter="2006-07-18T20:21:41Z">
    </saml:Conditions>
    <saml:AuthnStatement
      AuthnInstant="2006-07-17T20:31:41Z">
      <saml:AuthnContext>
        <saml:AuthnContextClassRef>
            urn:oasis:names:tc:SAML:2.0:ac:classes:TLSClient
        </saml:AuthnContextClassRef>
      </saml:AuthnContext>
    </saml:AuthnStatement>
    <saml:AttributeStatement>
      <saml:Attribute
        xmlns:x500="urn:oasis:names:tc:SAML:2.0:profiles:attribute:X500"
        x500:Encoding="LDAP"
        NameFormat="urn:oasis:names:tc:SAML:2.0:attrname-format:uri"
        Name="urn:oid:2.5.4.42"
        FriendlyName="givenName">
        <saml:AttributeValue
          xsi:type="xs:string">Tom</saml:AttributeValue>
      </saml:Attribute>
      <saml:Attribute
        xmlns:x500="urn:oasis:names:tc:SAML:2.0:profiles:attribute:X500"
        x500:Encoding="LDAP"
        NameFormat="urn:oasis:names:tc:SAML:2.0:attrname-format:uri"
        Name="urn:oid:1.3.6.1.4.1.1466.115.121.1.26"
        FriendlyName="mail">
        <saml:AttributeValue
          xsi:type="xs:string">trscavo@example.org</saml:AttributeValue>
      </saml:Attribute>
    </saml:AttributeStatement>
  </saml:Assertion>

In contrast to the BearerAssertion shown earlier, this assertion has a longer lifetime corresponding to the lifetime of the X.509 certificate that the principal used to authenticate to the identity provider. Moreover, since the assertion is signed, the user can push this assertion to a relying party, and as long as the user can prove possession of the corresponding private key (hence the name "holder-of-key"), the relying party can be assured that the assertion is authentic.

== SAML 2.0 metadata ==
Quite literally, metadata is what makes SAML work (or work well). Some important uses of metadata include:

- A service provider prepares to transmit a <samlp:AuthnRequest> element to an identity provider via the browser. How does the service provider know the identity provider is authentic and not some evil identity provider trying to phish the user's password? The service provider consults its list of trusted identity providers in metadata before issuing an authentication request.
- In the previous scenario, how does the service provider know where to send the user with the authentication request? The service provider looks up a pre-arranged endpoint location of the trusted identity provider in metadata.
- An identity provider receives a <samlp:AuthnRequest> element from a service provider via the browser. How does the identity provider know the service provider is authentic and not some evil service provider trying to harvest personally identifiable information regarding the user? The identity provider consults its list of trusted service providers in metadata before issuing an authentication response.
- In the previous scenario, how does the identity provider encrypt the SAML assertion so that the trusted service provider (and only the trusted service provider) can decrypt the assertion. The identity provider uses the service provider's encryption certificate in metadata to encrypt the assertion.
- Continuing with the previous scenario, how does the identity provider know where to send the user with the authentication response? The identity provider looks up a pre-arranged endpoint location of the trusted service provider in metadata.
- How does the service provider know that the authentication response came from a trusted identity provider? The service provider verifies the signature on the assertion using the public key of the identity provider from metadata.
- How does the service provider know where to resolve an artifact received from a trusted identity provider? The service provider looks up the pre-arranged endpoint location of the identity provider's artifact resolution service from metadata.

Metadata ensures a secure transaction between an identity provider and a service provider. Before metadata, trust information was encoded into the implementation in a proprietary manner. Now the sharing of trust information is facilitated by standard metadata. SAML 2.0 provides a well-defined, interoperable metadata format that entities can leverage to bootstrap the trust process.

=== Identity Provider Metadata ===
An identity provider publishes data about itself in an <md:EntityDescriptor> element:

  <md:EntityDescriptor entityID="https://idp.example.org/SAML2" validUntil="2013-03-22T23:00:00Z"
    xmlns:md="urn:oasis:names:tc:SAML:2.0:metadata"
    xmlns:saml="urn:oasis:names:tc:SAML:2.0:assertion"
    xmlns:ds="http://www.w3.org/2000/09/xmldsig#">
    <!-- insert ds:Signature element (omitted) -->
    <!-- insert md:IDPSSODescriptor element (below) -->
    <md:Organization>
      <md:OrganizationName xml:lang="en">Some Non-profit Organization of New York</md:OrganizationName>
      <md:OrganizationDisplayName xml:lang="en">Some Non-profit Organization</md:OrganizationDisplayName>
      <md:OrganizationURL xml:lang="en">https://www.example.org/</md:OrganizationURL>
    </md:Organization>
    <md:ContactPerson contactType="technical">
      <md:SurName>SAML Technical Support</md:SurName>
      <md:EmailAddress>mailto:saml-support@example.org</md:EmailAddress>
    </md:ContactPerson>
  </md:EntityDescriptor>

Note the following details about this entity descriptor:

- The entityID attribute is the unique identifier of the entity.
- The validUntil attribute gives the expiration date of the metadata.
- The <ds:Signature> element (which has been omitted for simplicity) contains a digital signature that ensures the authenticity and integrity of the metadata.
- The organization identified in the <md:Organization> element is "responsible for the entity" described by the entity descriptor (section 2.3.2 of SAMLMeta).
- The contact information in the <md:ContactPerson> element identifies a technical contact responsible for the entity. Multiple contacts and contact types are possible. See section 2.3.2.2 of SAMLMeta.

By definition, an identity provider manages an SSO service that supports the SAML Web Browser SSO profile specified in SAMLProf. See, for example, the identity provider described in the <md:IDPSSODescriptor> element shown in the next section.

==== SSO service metadata ====
The SSO service at the identity provider is described in an <md:IDPSSODescriptor> element:

  <md:IDPSSODescriptor
    protocolSupportEnumeration="urn:oasis:names:tc:SAML:2.0:protocol">
    <md:KeyDescriptor use="signing">
      <ds:KeyInfo>...</ds:KeyInfo>
    </md:KeyDescriptor>
    <md:ArtifactResolutionService isDefault="true" index="0"
      Binding="urn:oasis:names:tc:SAML:2.0:bindings:SOAP"
      Location="https://idp.example.org/SAML2/ArtifactResolution"/>
    <md:NameIDFormat>urn:oasis:names:tc:SAML:1.1:nameid-format:emailAddress</md:NameIDFormat>
    <md:NameIDFormat>urn:oasis:names:tc:SAML:2.0:nameid-format:transient</md:NameIDFormat>
    <md:SingleSignOnService
      Binding="urn:oasis:names:tc:SAML:2.0:bindings:HTTP-Redirect"
      Location="https://idp.example.org/SAML2/SSO/Redirect"/>
    <md:SingleSignOnService
      Binding="urn:oasis:names:tc:SAML:2.0:bindings:HTTP-POST"
      Location="https://idp.example.org/SAML2/SSO/POST"/>
    <md:SingleSignOnService
      Binding="urn:oasis:names:tc:SAML:2.0:bindings:HTTP-Artifact"
      Location="https://idp.example.org/SAML2/Artifact"/>
    <saml:Attribute
      NameFormat="urn:oasis:names:tc:SAML:2.0:attrname-format:uri"
      Name="urn:oid:1.3.6.1.4.1.5923.1.1.1.1"
      FriendlyName="eduPersonAffiliation">
      <saml:AttributeValue>member</saml:AttributeValue>
      <saml:AttributeValue>student</saml:AttributeValue>
      <saml:AttributeValue>faculty</saml:AttributeValue>
      <saml:AttributeValue>employee</saml:AttributeValue>
      <saml:AttributeValue>staff</saml:AttributeValue>
    </saml:Attribute>
  </md:IDPSSODescriptor>

The previous metadata element describes the SSO service at the identity provider. Note the following details about this element:

- The identity provider software is configured with a private SAML signing key and/or a private back-channel TLS key. The corresponding public key is included in the <md:KeyDescriptor use="signing"> element in IdP metadata. The key material has been omitted from the key descriptor for brevity.
- The Binding attribute of the <md:ArtifactResolutionService> element indicates that the SAML SOAP binding (SAMLBind) should be used for artifact resolution.
- The Location attribute of the <md:ArtifactResolutionService> element is used in step 8 of the "double artifact" profile.
- The value of the index attribute of the <md:ArtifactResolutionService> element is used as the EndpointIndex in the construction of a SAML type 0x0004 artifact.
- The <md:NameIDFormat> elements indicate what SAML name identifier formats (SAMLCore) the SSO service supports.
- The Binding attributes of the <md:SingleSignOnService> elements are standard URIs specified in the SAML 2.0 Binding specification (SAMLBind).
- The Location attribute of the <md:SingleSignOnService> element that supports the HTTP POST binding is used in step 2 of the "double POST" profile.
- The Location attribute of the <md:SingleSignOnService> element that supports the HTTP Artifact binding is used in step 2 of the "double artifact" profile.
- The <saml:Attribute> element describes an attribute that the identity provider is willing to assert (subject to policy). The <saml:AttributeValue> elements enumerate the possible values the attribute may take on.

As noted at the beginning of this section, the values of the Location attributes are used by a service provider to route SAML messages, which minimizes the possibility of a rogue identity provider orchestrating a man-in-the-middle attack.

=== Service provider metadata ===
Like the identity provider, a service provider publishes data about itself in an <md:EntityDescriptor> element:

  <md:EntityDescriptor entityID="https://sp.example.com/SAML2" validUntil="2013-03-22T23:00:00Z"
    xmlns:md="urn:oasis:names:tc:SAML:2.0:metadata"
    xmlns:saml="urn:oasis:names:tc:SAML:2.0:assertion"
    xmlns:ds="http://www.w3.org/2000/09/xmldsig#">
    <!-- insert ds:Signature element (omitted) -->
    <!-- insert md:SPSSODescriptor element (see below) -->
    <md:Organization>
      <md:OrganizationName xml:lang="en">Some Commercial Vendor of California</md:OrganizationName>
      <md:OrganizationDisplayName xml:lang="en">Some Commercial Vendor</md:OrganizationDisplayName>
      <md:OrganizationURL xml:lang="en">https://www.example.com/</md:OrganizationURL>
    </md:Organization>
    <md:ContactPerson contactType="technical">
      <md:SurName>SAML Technical Support</md:SurName>
      <md:EmailAddress>mailto:saml-support@example.com</md:EmailAddress>
    </md:ContactPerson>
  </md:EntityDescriptor>

Note the following details about this entity descriptor:

- The entityID attribute is the unique identifier of the entity.
- The validUntil attribute gives the expiration date of the metadata.
- The <ds:Signature> element (which has been omitted for simplicity) contains a digital signature that ensures the authenticity and integrity of the metadata.
- The organization identified in the <md:Organization> element is "responsible for the entity" described by the entity descriptor (section 2.3.2 of SAMLMeta).
- The contact information in the <md:ContactPerson> element identifies a technical contact responsible for the entity. Multiple contacts and contact types are possible. See section 2.3.2.2 of SAMLMeta.

By definition, a service provider manages an assertion consumer service that supports the SAML Web Browser SSO profile specified in SAMLProf. See, for example, the service provider described in the <md:SPSSODescriptor> element shown in the next section.

==== Assertion consumer service metadata ====
The assertion consumer service is contained in an <md:SPSSODescriptor> element:

  <md:SPSSODescriptor
    protocolSupportEnumeration="urn:oasis:names:tc:SAML:2.0:protocol">
    <md:KeyDescriptor use="signing">
      <ds:KeyInfo>...</ds:KeyInfo>
    </md:KeyDescriptor>
    <md:KeyDescriptor use="encryption">
      <ds:KeyInfo>...</ds:KeyInfo>
    </md:KeyDescriptor>
    <md:ArtifactResolutionService isDefault="true" index="0"
      Binding="urn:oasis:names:tc:SAML:2.0:bindings:SOAP"
      Location="https://sp.example.com/SAML2/ArtifactResolution"/>
    <md:NameIDFormat>urn:oasis:names:tc:SAML:1.1:nameid-format:emailAddress</md:NameIDFormat>
    <md:NameIDFormat>urn:oasis:names:tc:SAML:2.0:nameid-format:transient</md:NameIDFormat>
    <md:AssertionConsumerService isDefault="true" index="0"
      Binding="urn:oasis:names:tc:SAML:2.0:bindings:HTTP-POST"
      Location="https://sp.example.com/SAML2/SSO/POST"/>
    <md:AssertionConsumerService index="1"
      Binding="urn:oasis:names:tc:SAML:2.0:bindings:HTTP-Artifact"
      Location="https://sp.example.com/SAML2/Artifact"/>
    <md:AttributeConsumingService isDefault="true" index="1">
      <md:ServiceName xml:lang="en">Service Provider Portal</md:ServiceName>
      <md:RequestedAttribute
        NameFormat="urn:oasis:names:tc:SAML:2.0:attrname-format:uri"
        Name="urn:oid:1.3.6.1.4.1.5923.1.1.1.1"
        FriendlyName="eduPersonAffiliation">
      </md:RequestedAttribute>
    </md:AttributeConsumingService>
  </md:SPSSODescriptor>

Note the following details about the <md:SPSSODescriptor> metadata element:

- The service provider software is configured with a private SAML signing key and/or a private back-channel TLS key. The corresponding public key is included in the <md:KeyDescriptor use="signing"> element in SP metadata. The key material has been omitted from the key descriptor for brevity.
- Likewise the service provider software is configured with a private SAML decryption key. A public SAML encryption key is included in the <md:KeyDescriptor use="encryption"> element in SP metadata. The key material has been omitted from the key descriptor for brevity.
- The index attribute of an <md:AssertionConsumerService> element is used as the value of the AssertionConsumerServiceIndex attribute in a <samlp:AuthnRequest> element.
- The Binding attributes of the <md:AssertionConsumerService> elements are standard URIs specified in the SAML 2.0 Binding specification (SAMLBind).
- The Location attribute of the <md:AssertionConsumerService> element that supports the HTTP POST binding (index="0") is used in step 4 of the "double POST" profile.
- The Location attribute of the <md:AssertionConsumerService> element that supports the HTTP Artifact binding (index="1") is used in step 6 of the "double artifact" profile.
- The <md:AttributeConsumingService> element is used by the identity provider to formulate an <saml:AttributeStatement> element that is pushed to the service provider in conjunction with Web Browser SSO.
- The index attribute of the <md:AttributeConsumingService> element is used as the value of the AttributeConsumingServiceIndex attribute in a <samlp:AuthnRequest> element.

As noted at the beginning of this section, the values of the Location attributes are used by an identity provider to route SAML messages, which minimizes the possibility of a rogue service provider orchestrating a man-in-the-middle attack.

=== Metadata aggregates ===
In the previous examples, each <md:EntityDescriptor> element is shown to be digitally signed. In practice, however, multiple <md:EntityDescriptor> elements are grouped together under an <md:EntitiesDescriptor> element with a single digital signature over the entire aggregate:

  <md:EntitiesDescriptor validUntil="2013-03-22T23:00:00Z"
    xmlns:md="urn:oasis:names:tc:SAML:2.0:metadata"
    xmlns:saml="urn:oasis:names:tc:SAML:2.0:assertion"
    xmlns:ds="http://www.w3.org/2000/09/xmldsig#">
    <!-- insert ds:Signature element (omitted) -->
    <md:EntityDescriptor entityID="https://idp.example.org/SAML2">
      ...
    </md:EntityDescriptor>
    <md:EntityDescriptor entityID="https://sp.example.com/SAML2">
      ...
    </md:EntityDescriptor>
  </md:EntitiesDescriptor>

Note the following details about the above <md:EntitiesDescriptor> element:

- The digital signature (which has been omitted for brevity) covers the entire aggregate.
- The validUntil XML attribute has been elevated to the parent element, implying that the expiration date applies to each child element.
- The XML namespace declarations have been elevated to the parent element to avoid redundant namespace declarations.

Typically metadata aggregates are published by trusted third parties called federations who vouch for the integrity of all the metadata in the aggregate. Note that metadata aggregates can be very large, composed of hundreds or even thousands of entities per aggregate.

== See also ==
- Security Assertion Markup Language
- SAML 1.1
- SAML metadata
- SAML-based products and services
- OpenID Connect
