= Trust federation =

A trust federation is part of the evolving Identity Metasystem that will bring a new layer of persistent identity and trusted data sharing to the Internet. Although the concept of trust federations is technology neutral, several protocols like SAML, OpenID, Information Card, XDI can handle the challenges of technical interoperability. The challenge of business and social interoperability requires a new type of cooperative association similar to a credit card association. Instead of banks, however, a trust federation is an alliance of i-brokers and their customers who agree to abide by a common set of agreements in the care and handling of customer data. A model for trust federations is offered by Open Identity Exchange and Kantara Initiative, which is applied in the U.S. Government ICAM Trust Framework.

Some operational trust federations are:

- InCommon (academic, USA)
- REFEDs (Research and Education Federations, Europe)
- IGTF Interoperable Global Trust Federation
- Portalverbund Government Portal Federation, Austria

Trust federations are not limited to the social web use case, but apply to all federations where trust in identity and compliance to other objectives of information security such as confidentiality, integrity and privacy is brokered.

== See also ==
- I-name
- I-number
- XRI
- XDI
