= Paul Trevithick =

American entrepreneur (born 1959)

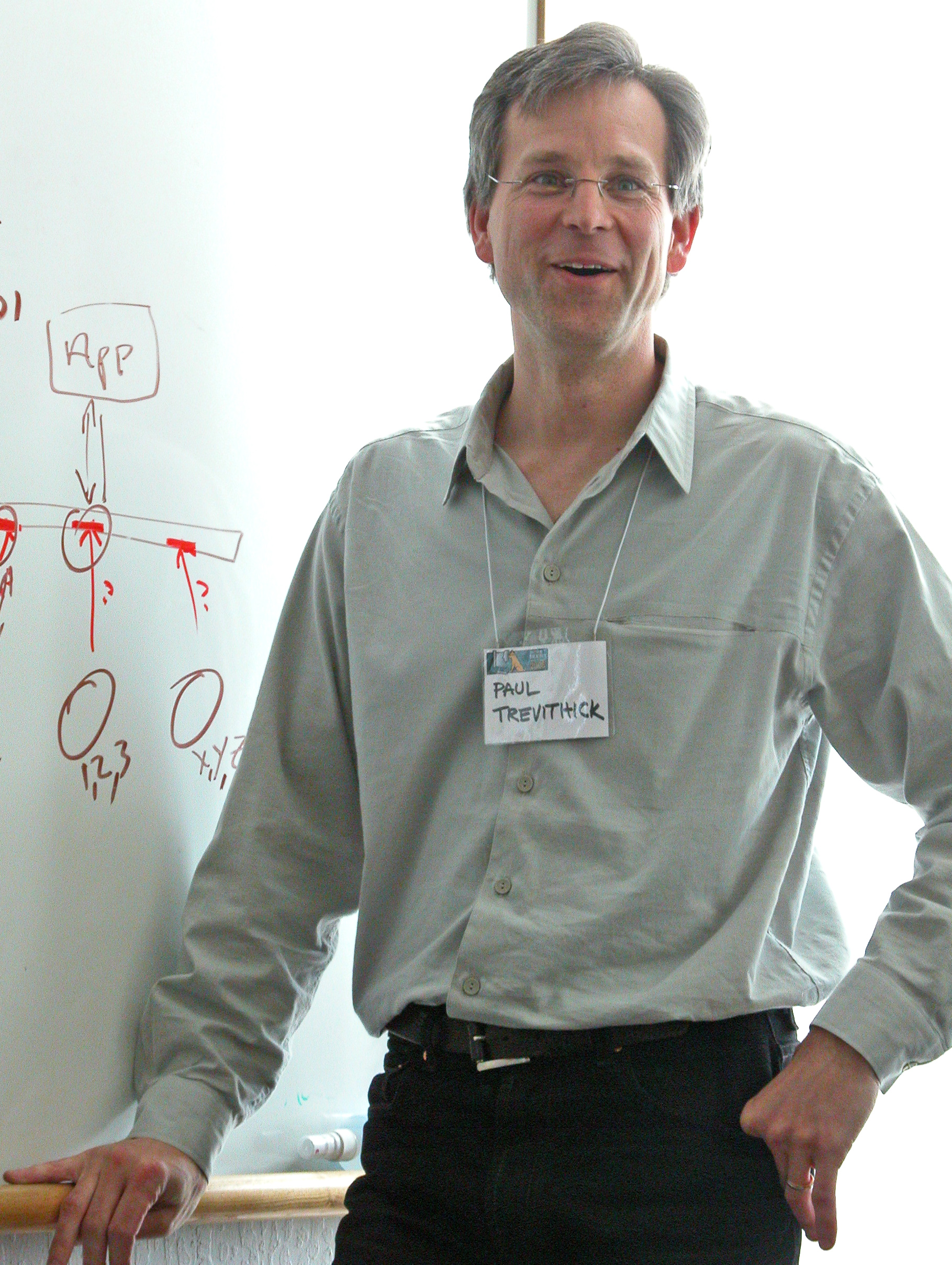
- Paul Trevithick at the Internet Identity Workshop 2006
- Born: Paul Byers Trevithick; 1959 (age 66–67); Winston-Salem, North Carolina United States of America
- Education: BS (Electrical Engineering) MIT
- Occupations: Technologist, privacy advocate, entrepreneur

Paul Byers Trevithick (born 1959) is currently a client partner and senior director at EPAM, advisor to early-stage startups, technologist, privacy advocate, and entrepreneur.

== Education ==
He grew up in Ottawa, Canada, attended MIT, and received a Bachelor of Science in electrical engineering and computer science in 1981 and was a research assistant at the MIT Media Lab in 1981 and 1982.

== Career ==
In 1981, he co-founded Lightspeed Computers which was ultimately acquired by DuPont. He was CEO and co-founder in 1985 of Archetype, Inc. which became the Pageflex division of Bitstream Inc. in April 1997. Trevithick then served as Bitstream's vice president of marketing, and starting in August 1998 its president.

Trevithick has contributed to World Wide Web Consortium, PODI, Organization for the Advancement of Structured Information Standards (OASIS), and ITU-T standards efforts. He was granted the Seybold Industry Vision award in 1999.

Trevithick led the development of the Experimental Laboratory for Investigating Collaboration, Information-sharing, and Trust (ELICIT) web-based platform under contract to the United States Department of Defense (OASD/NII) Command and Control Research Program (CCRP). ELICIT is a tool used in social science research.

In 2009, Trevithick founded Azigo and was until 2020 its chairman when the company was acquired. In 2012 he founded Swift Invention, Inc., a US-based offshore software development firm focusing on startup clients. He joined EPAM in 2014 and is currently a client partner and senior director.

== Work on information privacy and personal data ==
Starting in 2003, Trevithick worked on open source software for Internet security, and privacy for digital identities and social networks on the Internet. In 2004, he initiated and co-led what became the Eclipse Foundation's Higgins project. Supporting this effort, he co-founded, also in 2004, the SocialPhysics project in collaboration with the Berkman Klein Center for Internet & Society and co-founded the IdentityGang, now a part of Identity Commons. In 2008 Trevithick founded the Information Card Foundation and served as its chair.

In 2009 he co-founded and was a co-chair of the Kantara Initiative Universal Login User Experience Working Group. Trevithick is a past member of the Kantara Leadership Council and a steward of Identity Commons. This same year, he co-authored a paper on "Identity and Resilience" that was one of the 100 papers cited as informing the 2009 US White House CyberPolicy Review.

In 2021 he founded The Mee Foundation, with a mission to conduct research and develop open-source technology that will give individuals an independent identity, control over their personal information, and more privacy in the digital world. While at the Mee Foundation he co-authored the Identity Agents paper, and co-developed with PRIVO the AgeProtect online age verification proposal to protect minors on the internet, and the MySignals digital handshake.
