= XRD =

XRD may refer to:

- X-ray diffraction, used to study the structure, composition, and physical properties of materials
- Extensible Resource Descriptor, an XML format for discovery of metadata about a web resource
- Guilty Gear Xrd, a fighting video game.
