= Windows CardSpace =

Discontinued identity selector app by Microsoft

- The Windows CardSpace user interface, showing card creation template example
- Developer: Microsoft
- Operating system: Microsoft Windows
- Successor: U-Prove
- Service name: Windows CardSpace (idsvc)
- Type: Identity management system

Windows CardSpace (codenamed InfoCard) is a discontinued identity selector app by Microsoft. It stores references to digital identities of the users, presenting them as visual information cards. CardSpace provides a consistent UI designed to help people to easily and securely use these identities in applications and web sites where they are accepted. Resistance to phishing attacks and adherence to Kim Cameron's "7 Laws of Identity" were goals in its design.

CardSpace is a built-in component of Windows 7 and Windows Vista, and has been made available for Windows XP and Windows Server 2003 as part of the .NET Framework 3.x package.

== Overview ==
When an information card-enabled application or website wishes to obtain information about the user, it requests a particular set of claims. The CardSpace UI then appears, switching the display to the CardSpace service, which displays the user's stored identities as visual cards. The user selects a card to use, and the CardSpace software contacts the issuer of the identity to obtain a digitally signed XML token that contains the requested information. CardSpace also allows users to create personal (also known as self-issued) information cards, which can contain one or more of 14 fields of identity information such as full name and address. Other transactions may require a managed information card; these are issued by a third-party identity provider that makes the claims on the person's behalf, such as a bank, employer, or a government agency.

Windows CardSpace is built on top of the Web services protocol stack, an open set of XML-based protocols, including WS-Security, WS-Trust, WS-MetadataExchange and WS-SecurityPolicy. This means that any technology or platform that supports these protocols can integrate with CardSpace. To accept information cards, a web developer needs to declare an HTML <OBJECT> tag that specifies the claims the website is demanding and implement code to decrypt the returned token and extract the claim values. If an identity provider wants to issue tokens, it must provide a means by which a user can obtain a managed card and provide a Security Token Service (STS) which handles WS-Trust requests and returns an appropriate encrypted and signed token. During the 2000s, identity providers that didn't wish to build STS could obtain one from a variety of vendors, including PingIdentity, BMC, Sun Microsystems, Microsoft, or Siemens.

Because CardSpace and the identity metasystem upon which it is based are token-format-agnostic, CardSpace did not compete directly with other Internet identity architectures like OpenID and SAML. These three approaches to identity can be seen as complementary, because during the 2000s, information cards could be used today for signing into OpenID providers, Windows Live ID accounts, and SAML identity providers.

IBM and Novell planned to support the Higgins trust framework to provide a development framework that includes support for information cards and the Web services protocol stack, thus including CardSpace within a broader, extensible framework also supporting other identity-related technologies, such as SAML and OpenID.

== Release ==
Microsoft initially shipped Windows CardSpace with the .NET Framework 3.0, which runs on Windows XP, Windows Server 2003, and Windows Vista. It is installed by default on Windows Vista as well as Windows 7 and is available as a free download for XP and Server 2003 via Windows Update. An updated version of CardSpace shipped with the .NET Framework 3.5. The new Credential Manager in Windows 7 uses Windows CardSpace for the management and storage of saved user credentials.

== Discontinuation ==
On February 15, 2011, Microsoft announced that Windows CardSpace 2.0 would not be shipped. Microsoft later worked on a replacement called U-Prove.

== See also ==
- Information Card
- Higgins project
- Shibboleth (Internet2)
- Identity management systems
- Windows Hello
