= PNML =

PNML may refer to:

- PetName Markup Language, XML proposal for using Petname systems
- Petri Net Markup Language
