= Pet name (disambiguation) =

A pet name is a name used to show affection for a person.

Pet name(s) may also refer to:

- Pet names, names of pets
- Petname, a security-enhancing software naming system
- "Pet Names", a 1997 song by Smash Mouth from the album Fush Yu Mang
