= Kim Cameron =

Kim Cameron may refer to:

- Kim S. Cameron, professor of management and organizations
- Kim Cameron (computer scientist)
- Kim Cameron (musician) (born 1966), American musician and songwriter
- Kimberly Keiko Cameron, main character of Skim
