= Extensible Name Service =

XML-based digital identity architecture

Extensible Name Service (XNS) is an open protocol for universal addressing and automated data exchange. It is an XML-based digital identity architecture.

== History ==
The development of XML in 1998 led to the XNS project, and the establishment of an international non-profit governance organization, XNS Public Trust Organization (XNSORG), in early 2000.

The startup OneName introduced XNS to consumers in 2001.

In 2002, the XNS specifications were contributed by XNSORG to OASIS, where they became part of the XRI (Extensible Resource Identifier) and XDI (XRI Data Interchange) Technical Committees. Together these two standards, XRI and XDI, form the basis for the formation of the Dataweb.

XNSORG has since evolved into XDI.ORG, and now offers community-based XRI/XDI infrastructure.

== See also ==
- OpenID
