= Internet Identity Workshop =

- Abbreviation: IIW
- Formation: 2005
- Founders: Doc Searls, Kaliya Young, Phil Windley
- Location: Mountain View, California, United States
- Website: www.internetidentityworkshop.com

The Internet Identity Workshop (IIW) is a semi-annual conference focused on the development and evolution of open standards, protocols, and technologies for user-controlled digital identity. The workshop operates as an open space unconference, allowing participants to set the agenda each day.

== History ==
IIW was founded in 2005 by Kaliya Young, Doc Searls, and Phil Windley, with the goal of collaboration in the field of digital identity. They established the event in response to the growing need for open standards and interoperable identity solutions on the internet. Its goal is to put people in control of their identities and private information. IIW has supported the development of identity technologies such as OAuth, OpenID, passkeys, self-sovereign identity (SSI), and decentralized identifiers (DIDs). By the mid-2010s, sessions at IIW also addressed the topic of establishing identity on the blockchain.

In 2020, in a Wired interview, Young described her goal as being able to take her identity with her "from Facebook to Google to her doctor's office to her bank, with the same ease she can plug any electrical device into any socket in any wall. And she doesn't want any company or government to have the authority to track, cancel or suspend her. But to get what she wants, Young needs to add a new layer to internet protocols. That's what she's been working on for the past 15 years."

In 2025, experts who participated in IIW analyzed phone home surveillance features in mobile driver's licenses.

Since 2025, IIW has been operated by the IIW Foundation, a non-profit 501(c)3 organization.

== Impact ==
A challenge in implementing distributed identity is the discovery of identities created with the Open ID 2.0 standard. A technique to address this challenge was demonstrated at a 2006 IIW, which helped establish the extensions that allowed this discovery method to spread. The Internet Identity Workshop was one of the first venues to propose and discuss the creation of decentralized identifiers, or DIDs. Following their introduction, DIDs were adopted by the World Wide Web Consortium (W3C) and have since found applications in digital copyright and other areas that require digital identifiers.

In 2022, Chinese researchers presented a developing energy peer-to-peer network that interconnects a large number of distributed harvesting devices to achieve a two-way flow of energy. In the conference proceedings of that year's IEEE 2nd International Conference on Electrical Engineering and Control Science (IC2ECS), the authors referred to the introduction of enabling technology built on DIDs first formally proposed at a 2015 IIW.

Another area of interest for the IIW community is off-blockchain decentralized identity management for digital wallets. These identities can be managed using asymmetric cryptographic keys, eliminating the need for centralized management.

== See also ==
- Access control
- Identity and access management
- Identity driven networking
- Identity provider
- Identity threat detection and response
- Identity verification service
- Identity-based security
- Online identity management
- SAML 2.0
- XDI
