= U-Prove =

- Original author: Credentica
- Developer: Microsoft
- Written in: C#, JavaScript
- Platform: Cross-platform
- Type: Identity management
- License: Apache License 2.0
- Website: www.credentica.com
- Repository: github.com/Microsoft/uprove-csharp-sdk

U-Prove is a free and open-source technology and accompanying software development kit for user-centric identity management. The underlying cryptographic protocols were designed in 1993 by Dr. Stefan Brands and further developed by Credentica and, subsequently, Microsoft. The technology was developed to allow internet users to disclose only the minimum amount of personal data when making electronic transactions as a way to reduce the likelihood of privacy violations.

== Overview ==
U-Prove enables application developers to reconcile seemingly conflicting security and privacy objectives (including anonymity), and allows for digital identity claims to be efficiently tied to the use of tamper-resistant devices such as smart cards. Application areas of particular interest include cross-domain enterprise identity and access management, e-government SSO and data sharing, electronic health records, anonymous electronic voting, policy-based digital rights management, social networking data portability, and electronic payments.

In 2008, Microsoft committed to opening up the U-Prove technology. As the first step, in March 2010 the company released a cryptographic specification and open-source API implementation code for part of the U-Prove technology as a Community Technology Preview under Microsoft's Open Specification Promise. Since then, several extensions have been released under the same terms and the technology has been tested in real-life applications.

In 2010, the International Association of Privacy Professionals (IAPP) honored U-Prove with the 2010 Privacy Innovation Award for Technology.

Microsoft also won the European Identity Award in the Best Innovation category for U-Prove at the European Identity Conference 2010.

The U-Prove Crypto SDK for C# is licensed under Apache License 2.0 and the source code is available on GitHub.

Microsoft also provides a JavaScript SDK that implements the client-side of the U-Prove Cryptographic Specification.

== See also ==
- Blind signature
- Zero-knowledge proof
- Identity metasystem
