= Light-weight Identity =

Decentralised URL-based digital identity protocol

Light-weight Identity (LID) is a set of decentralised web protocols and software implementations for representing and using digital identities on the Internet in a light-weight manner, without reliance on a central authority.

It identifies people and other entities with URLs controlled by the subject and uses public-key cryptography and REST-style web interactions to authenticate those identifiers and exchange profile information.

LID was created in the mid-2000s by engineer Johannes Ernst and developed by NetMesh Inc. as part of the user-centric digital identity movement.

== History ==
In 2004 Johannes Ernst began experimenting with a web architecture in which users would be represented by URLs that could publish real-time information, share profile data and exchange signed and encrypted messages using GPG key pairs associated with each URL.

Early LID implementations were released by NetMesh as open-source components for common web platforms such as LAMP and J2EE, and were promoted within the emerging user-centric identity community alongside other experimental identity systems.

LID's use of HTTP URIs as identifiers and simple web-based discovery mechanisms overlapped with work on OpenID, and LID was discussed in the same family of "light-weight" identity protocols.

NetMesh engineers contributed the Extensible Resource Descriptor Sequence (XRDS) XML format, initially used for metadata discovery in LID, to the OpenID ecosystem, where XRDS became part of the discovery layer used by OpenID and related protocols.

== Architecture and features ==
LID identities are represented by ordinary HTTP URLs chosen or controlled by the subject, such as a personal site or profile page. Behind each LID URL is a small web application (the LID server) that responds to HTTP requests with machine-readable metadata describing the subject and exposing service endpoints for authentication, profile access and messaging.

== See also ==
- Digital identity
- Online identity
- Online identity management
- SAML-based products and services
- OpenID
