= Zooko Wilcox-O'Hearn =

Cypherpunk (born 1974)

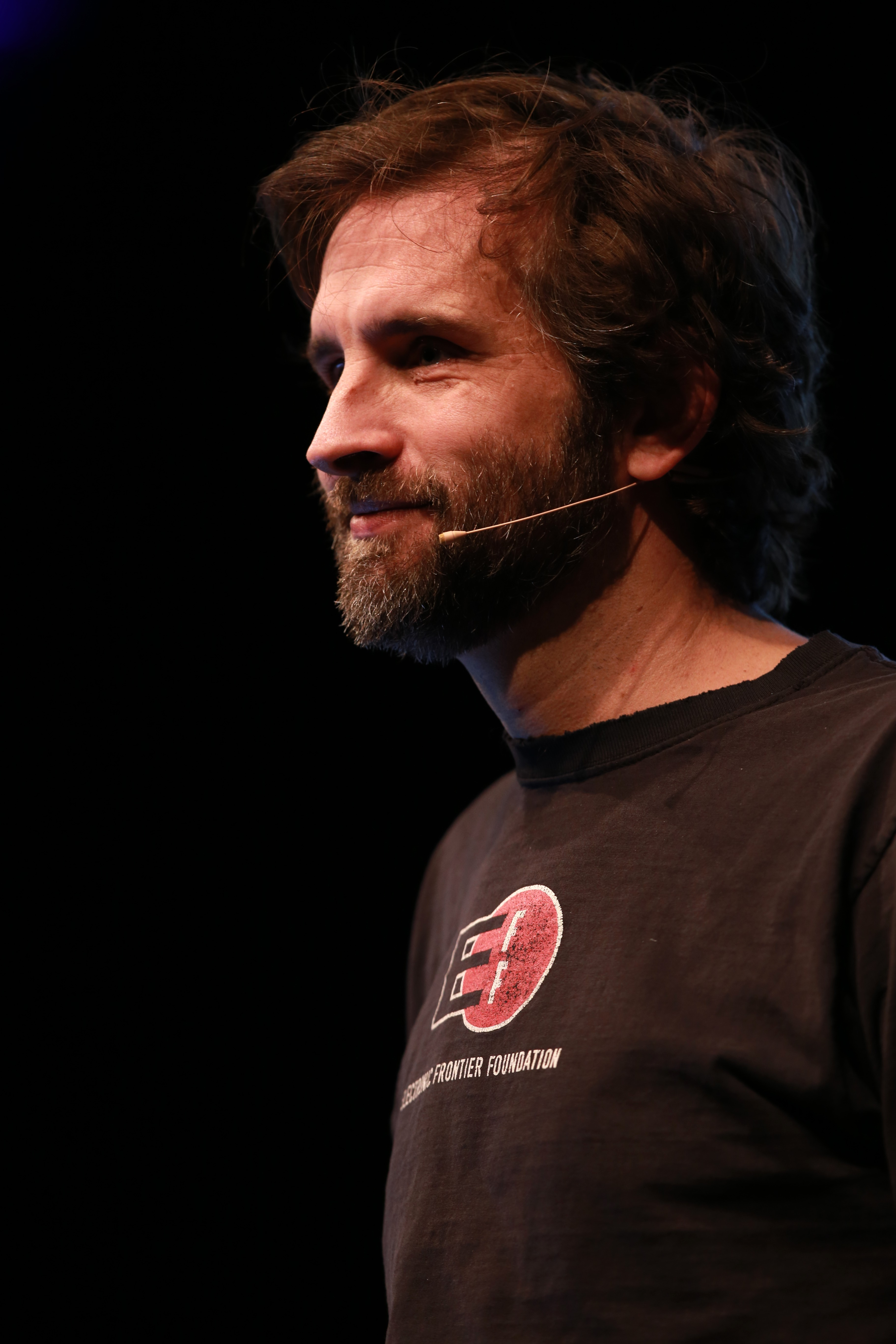
- Wilcox-O'Hearn in 2017
- Born: Bryce Wilcox; May 13, 1974 (age 52); Phoenix, Arizona
- Education: University of Colorado Boulder (BS, Computer Science, 1998)
- Known for: Zcash, Zooko's triangle, BLAKE2
- Parents: Ron Wilcox (father); Olene Harris (mother)
- Website: zooko on X

Zooko Wilcox-O'Hearn (born Bryce Wilcox; 13 May 1974 in Phoenix, Arizona), is an American Colorado-based computer security specialist, self-proclaimed cypherpunk, and ex-CEO of the Electric Coin Company (ECC), a for-profit company leading the development of Zcash.

== Biography ==
He is known for the Tahoe Least-Authority File Store (or Tahoe-LAFS), a secure, decentralized, fault-tolerant filesystem released under GPL and the TGPPL licenses. He is the creator of the Transitive Grace Period Public Licence (TGPPL).

Wilcox-O'Hearn is the designer of multiple network protocols that incorporate concepts such as self-contained economies and secure reputation systems. He is a member of the development team of ZRTP and the BLAKE2 cryptographic hash function.

Zooko's triangle is named after Wilcox-O'Hearn, who described the schema that relates three desirable properties of identifiers in 2001.

Wilcox-O'Hearn was founder and CEO of Least Authority Enterprises in Boulder, Colorado where he is now an advisor.

Zooko was a developer of the MojoNation P2P system and lead developer of the follow-on Mnet network, and a developer at SimpleGeo.

Wilcox-O'Hearn worked on the first cryptocurrency, DigiCash, with David Chaum in 1996. In January 2009, Wilcox was among the first people to publicly write about Bitcoin, and Bitcoin creator Satoshi Nakamoto subsequently linked to Wilcox's blog post from the Bitcoin project's website. He is a member of the founding team of the anonymous cryptocurrency Zcash, which launched in 2016. He served as CEO of the affiliated Electric Coin Company until December 18, 2023, when he was succeeded by Josh Swihart. Wilcox later commissioned the Rand Corporation to study whether anonymous coins were disproportionately represented in criminal transactions; the study found they were not.

Additionally Wilcox-O'Hearn was one of the co-creators of Blake3.
