= Confidential Consortium Framework =

Microsoft open source framework

Confidential Consortium Framework (CCF)
- Original authors: Microsoft Research & Microsoft Azure Engineering
- Developers: Microsoft and community
- Release: 2019; 7 years ago
- Stable release: 7.0.22 / October 22, 2026; 25 days ago
- Written in: C++, Python
- Operating system: Linux
- Platform: Cross-platform
- Type: Blockchain infrastructure framework
- License: Apache 2.0 License
- Website: microsoft.github.io/CCF/
- Repository: github.com/microsoft/CCF

Originally developed in 2019 by Microsoft under the name Coco and later rebranded to Confidential Consortium Framework (CCF), it is an open-source framework for developing of a new category of performant applications that focuses on the optimization of secure multi-party computation and data availability. Intended to accelerate the adoption of blockchain technology by enterprises, CCF can enable a variety of high-scale, confidential, permissioned distributed ledger networks that meet key enterprise requirements.

== Overview ==
CCF provides a multi-party computation (MPC) model of programming that prioritizes highly-available data storage and a universally-verifiable data log implemented a ledger abstraction.

As a permissioned framework, CCF leverages trust in a consortium of governing members and in a network of replicated hardware-protected execution environments (also known as trusted execution environments [TEEs] such as Intel Software Guard Extensions [SGX].) to achieve high throughput, low latency, strong integrity, and strong confidentiality for application data and code executing on the ledger. CCF embeds consensus protocols with Byzantine and crashes fault tolerant configurations. All configurations support strong service integrity based on the ledger contents. Even if some replicas are corrupt or their keys are compromised, they can be blamed based on their signed evidence of malicious activity recorded in the ledger. CCF supports transparent, programmable governance where the power of the consortium members is tunable and their activity is similarly recorded in the ledger for full auditability.

The framework is designed and built on a 6-point foundation of:

- Governance: transparent, programmable consortium-style proposal and voting based governance that supports enterprise operating models.
- Service Integrity: Hardware-backed integrity for application logic and data.
- Confidentiality and Privacy: All transactions are confidential by default.
- Performance: Database-like throughput, low latency, deterministic commits.
- Efficiency: Minimal execution overhead compared to traditional solutions.
- Resiliency: High availability and secure disaster recovery.

== Appearances ==
=== F.O.S.D.E.M. ===
The Confidential Consortium Framework was presented at the Free and Open Source Software Developers' European Meeting, FOSDEM 2020 in Brussels, Belgium. The CCF source code is licensed under Apache 2.0 License and available on GitHub. It runs on Linux and, according to Microsoft, it is primarily developed and tested on Ubuntu 18.04.

== See also ==
- Hyperledger Sawtooth
- Enterprise Ethereum Alliance
- Confidential Computing Consortium
