= Kim Cameron (computer scientist) =

Canadian computer scientist

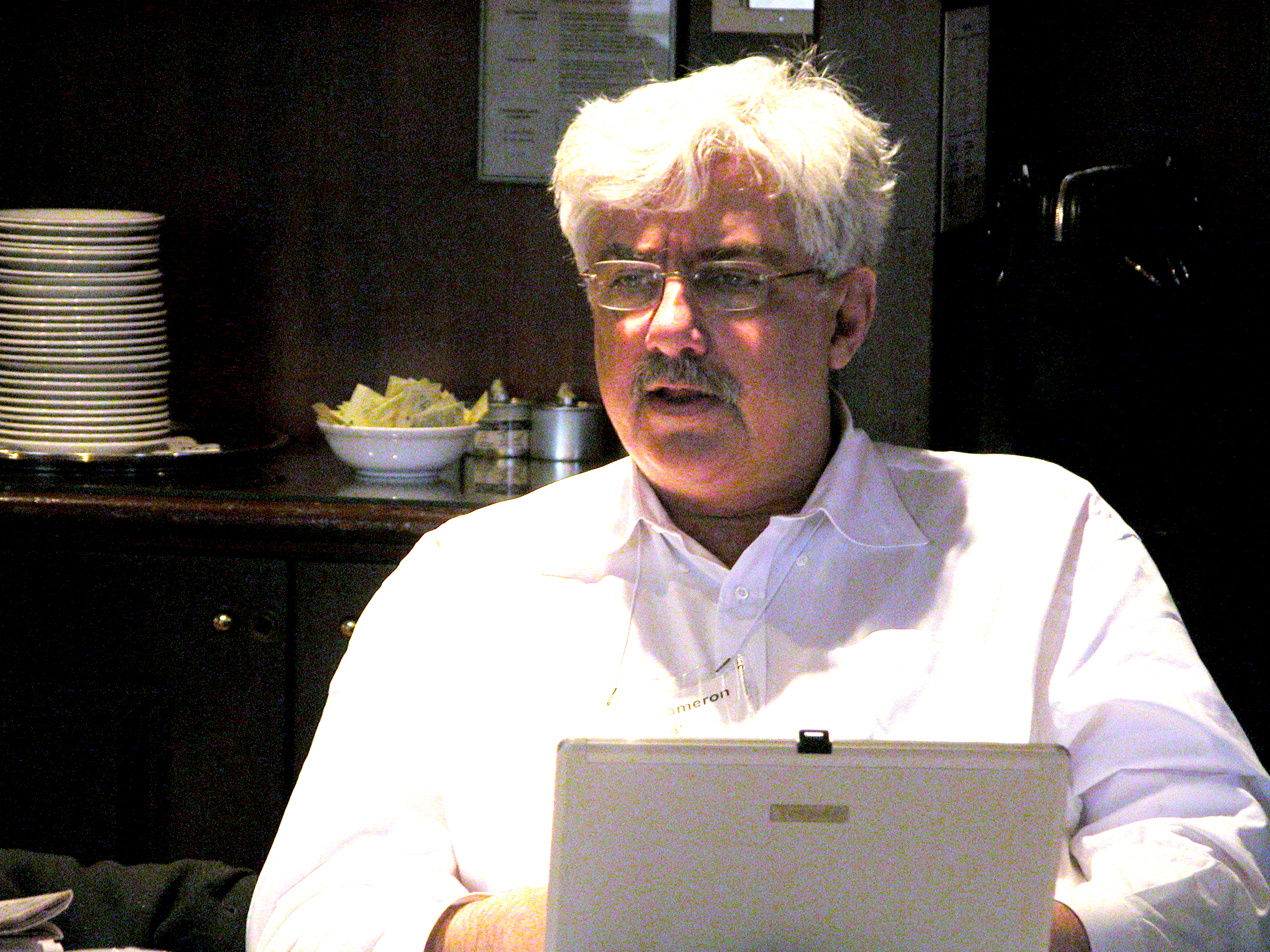
Cameron

Kim Cameron (August 31, 1948 — November 30, 2021) was a Canadian computer scientist who was Microsoft's chief architect of access and worked since the emergence of the Internet to create a humanistic system of Digital Identity. He was the originator of the 7 Laws of Identity, and developed the InfoCard architecture.

== Career ==
Cameron joined Microsoft in 1999 as part of Microsoft's acquisition of ZoomIt Corp., a software company dedicated to digital identity that he co-founded in 1980. According to his Microsoft biography, "as VP of Technology at ZoomIt, (Cameron) invented metadirectory technology and built the first shipping product." The ZoomIt product became Microsoft Identity Integration Server.

In 2000 he became the architect of Microsoft’s Active Directory, which evolved into the most widely deployed identity technology used in enterprises globally. As the growth of the Internet made the importance of identity increasingly evident, his role expanded to become chief architect of identity for Microsoft. In 2004 he wrote the Laws of Identity, a document that has long influenced both technologists and regulators, and which Microsoft adopted to guide its innovation. At the same time he began to champion innovations that would put users in control of their own identity as a way to solve the privacy and security problems of both individuals and organizations, which he continued to advance until his death in 2021.

Cameron retired from Microsoft in 2019 and became the chief identity officer at Convergence.Tech, a Canadian digital transformation company. Operating globally, Convergence.Tech provides identity and credentialing solutions to governments, humanitarian agencies, across the education sector, and in support of professional associations.

== Personal life ==
Cameron died of cancer on November 30, 2021.
