= IndieAuth =

Decentralized authentication protocol using OAuth 2.0

IndieAuth is an open standard decentralized authentication protocol that uses OAuth 2.0 and enables services to verify the identity of a user represented by a URL, as well as to obtain an access token, that can be used to access resources under the control of the user.

IndieAuth is developed in the IndieWeb community and was published as a W3C Note. It was published as a W3C Note by the Social Web Working Group due to lacking the time needed to formally progress it to a W3C recommendation, despite having several interoperable implementations.

== Implementations ==
- WordPress IndieAuth Plugin
- Known
- Micro.blog
- Grav (CMS) IndieAuth Plugin
- Drupal IndieWeb Plugin
- Cellar Door

== See also ==
- OpenID
- WebID
- Self-Sovereign Identity
