= Information Card Foundation =

Independent non-profit organization created in June 2008

Information Card Foundation (ICF) is an independent non-profit organization created in June 2008. The ICF consists of Steering Community board members and Steering Business board members. Some of the businesses include Equifax, Google, Microsoft, Novell, Oracle Corporation and PayPal. The foundation was formed to promote Information Card technology, a user-centric, cross-platform, identity technology that shifts control over personal information to the individual. Information cards allow the user to the control release of self-asserted claims or claims made by a third-party identity provider (called a "card issuer") represented using a card/wallet metaphor in a user interface (web or smart client) called a "card selector", to relying parties (i.e. apps and websites)
