= Higgins project =

Framework for personal identity management

- Original author(s): Paul Trevithick
- Developer(s): Eclipse Foundation
- Stable release: 2.0.0 / 15 June 2012; 12 years ago
- Type: Personal data service
- Website: eclipse.org/higgins/

Higgins is an open-source project dedicated to giving individuals more control over their personal identity, profile and social network data.

The project is organized into three main areas:

1. Active Clients - An active client integrates with a browser and runs on a computer or mobile device.
  - Higgins 1. X: the active client supports the OASIS IMI protocol and performs the functions of an Information Card selector.
  - Higgins 2.0: the plan is to move beyond selector functionality to add support for managing passwords and Higgins relationship cards, as well other protocols such as OpenID. It also becomes a client for the Personal Data Store (see below) and thereby provides a kind of dashboard for personal information and a place to manage "permissioning"—deciding who gets access to what slice of the user's data.
2. Personal Data Store (PDS) is a new work area under development for Higgins 2.0. A PDS stores local personal data, controls access to remotely hosted personal data, synchronizes personal data to other devices and computers, accessed directly or via a PDS client it allows the user to share selected aspects of their information with people and organizations that they trust.
3. Identity Services - Code for (i) an IMI and SAML compatible Identity Provider, and (ii) enabling websites to be IMI and OpenID compatible.

== History ==
The initial code for the Higgins Project was written by Paul Trevithick in the summer of 2003. In 2004 the effort became part of SocialPhysics.org, a collaboration between Paul and Mary Ruddy, of Azigo, (formerly Parity Communications, Inc.), and Meristic, and John Clippinger, at the Berkman Center for Internet & Society. Higgins, under its original name Eclipse Trust Framework, was accepted into the Eclipse Foundation in early 2005. Mary and Paul are the project co-leads. IBM and Novell's participation in the project was announced in early 2006. Higgins has received technology contributions from IBM, Novell, Oracle, CA, Serena, Google, eperi GmbH as well as from several other firms and individuals. Version 1.0 was released in February 2008.

As of 2019 Eclipse Higgins is archived, meaning that it is an inactive project.

== See also ==
- Windows CardSpace (formerly code-named InfoCard)
- I-Card
- Information Card
