= Petname =

Security-enhancing software naming system

Petname systems are naming systems that claim to possess all three naming properties of Zooko's triangle - global, secure, and memorable. Software that uses such a system can satisfy all three requirements. Such systems can be used to enhance security, such as preventing phishing attacks. Unlike traditional identity systems, which focus on the service provider, Petname systems are decentralized and designed to facilitate the needs of the enduser as they interact with multiple services.

== History ==
Though the Petname model was formally described in 2005 by Mark Stiegler, the potential of the system was discovered by several people successively.

== Examples ==
- The GNU Name System (GNS) – a decentralized alternative to DNS based on the principle of a petname system
- CapDesk – a distributed desktop environment
- Petname Tool (discontinued browser extension) – There was a browser extension available for Firefox called Petname Tool that allowed pet names to be assigned to secure websites. Use of this extension could help prevent phishing attacks.

== PetName Markup Language ==
The PetName Markup Language (PNML) is a proposal for embedding Petname information into other systems using a custom markup language.

PNML consists of two tags:

- <pn>pet-name-string</pn>
- <key>stringified-cryptographic-key</key>
