= Zooko's triangle =

Trilemma in computer science concerning network naming schemes

Zooko's triangle defines three traits of a network protocol identifier as Human-meaningful, Decentralized and Secure.

Zooko's triangle is a trilemma of three properties that some people consider desirable for names of participants in a network protocol:

- Human-meaningful: Meaningful and memorable (low-entropy) names are provided to the users.
- Secure: The amount of damage a malicious entity can inflict on the system should be as low as possible.
- Decentralized: Names correctly resolve to their respective entities without the use of a central authority or service.

== Overview ==
Zooko Wilcox-O'Hearn conjectured that no single kind of name can achieve more than two. For example: DNSSec offers a human-meaningful, secure naming scheme, but is not decentralized as it relies on trusted root-servers; .onion addresses and bitcoin addresses are secure and decentralized but not human-meaningful; and I2P uses name translation services which are secure (as they run locally) and provide human-meaningful names – but fail to provide unique entities when used globally in a decentralised network without authorities. (Note: Zooko Wilcox-O'Hearn has since deleted the original blogpost)

== Solutions ==
Several systems that exhibit all three properties of Zooko's triangle include:

- Computer scientist Nick Szabo's paper "Secure Property Titles with Owner Authority" illustrated that all three properties can be achieved up to the limits of Byzantine fault tolerance.
- Activist Aaron Swartz described a naming system based on Bitcoin employing Bitcoin's distributed blockchain as a proof-of-work to establish consensus of domain name ownership. These systems remain vulnerable to Sybil attack, but are secure under Byzantine assumptions.
- Far-right political blogger Curtis Yarvin implemented a decentralized version of IP addresses in Urbit that hash to four-syllable, human-readable names.

Several platforms implement refutations of Zooko's conjecture, including: Twister (which use Swartz' system with a bitcoin-like system), Blockstack (separate blockchain), Namecoin (separate blockchain), LBRY (separate blockchain – content discovery, ownership, and peer-to-peer file-sharing), Monero, OpenAlias, Ethereum Name Service, and the Handshake Protocol.

== See also ==
- Petname
- GNU Name System
- CAP theorem
