= Vendor relationship management =

Vendor relationship management (VRM) are software systems that aim to provide customers with both independence from vendors and better means for engaging with vendors. They are a category of systems used by businesses manage the vendor relationship. These same tools can also apply to individuals' relations with other institutions and organizations.

== History ==
The term first appeared in Computerworld magazine in May 2000, albeit in the context of a business managing its IT vendors. The term was first used in the context here by Mike Vizard on a Gillmor Gang podcast on September 1, 2006, in a conversation with Doc Searls about the project Searls had recently started as a fellow at the Berkman Center for Internet & Society at Harvard University. Vizard saw VRM as a natural counterpart of customer relationship management. Searls' project then became named ProjectVRM, and has since worked to guide the development of VRM tools and services.

Doc Searls believed VRM would help create what he called an intention economy, which he described first in an essay by that name in Linux Journal. There, he wrote, "The Intention Economy grows around buyers, not sellers. It leverages the simple fact that buyers are the first source of money, and that they come ready-made. You don't need advertising to make them. The Intention Economy is about markets, not marketing. You don't need marketing to make Intention Markets." In May 2012 Searl's book titled The Intention Economy was published by Harvard Business Press. Searls also saw VRM addressing some of what he calls the "unfinished business" of The Cluetrain Manifesto, which he co-wrote in 1999 with Christopher Locke, Rick Levine and David Weinberger. Here he refers to Cluetrain's preamble, which says "We are not seats or eyeballs or end users or consumers. We are human beings—and our reach exceeds your grasp. Deal with it."

CRM magazine devoted much of its May 2010 issue to VRM. The magazine also named Doc Searls' one of its influential leaders in its August issue.

In early 2012, Customer Commons, a non-profit, was born out of ProjectVRM at Harvard, to support VRM principles. Customer Commons' mission is to educate, research, support and create VRM tools, and generally advocate for individuals as they interact with entities on and offline. Doc Searls is one of Customer Commons co-founders and board members.

In 2021, the terms VRM and supplier relationship management (SRM) have become synonyms in commercial software usage, with solutions dubbed "VRM", coming to the market.

== Tools ==
VRM tools provide customers with the means to bear their share of the relationship burden with vendors and other organizations. They relieve customer relationship management (CRM) of the perceived need to "target," "capture," "acquire," "lock in," "direct," "own," "manage," and otherwise take the lead of relationships with customers. With VRM operating on the customer's side, customers are also involved as participants, rather than as followers.

In its description of ProjectVRM, the Berkman Center says "The primary theory behind ProjectVRM is that many market problems (including the widespread belief that customer lock-in is a 'best practice') can only be solved from the customer side: by making the customer a fully empowered actor in the marketplace, rather than one whose power in many cases is dependent on exclusive relationships with vendors, by coerced agreement provided entirely by those vendors."

== VRM development work ==
As of August 2010 ProjectVRM lists nineteen VRM development efforts. These include:

- Azigo
- EmanciPay
- Information Sharing Workgroup
- Kynetx and Kinetic Rule Language (KRL)
- ListenLog
- Mydex
- Onecub
- digitando
- Paoga
- SwitchBook
- User-Managed Access (UMA)
- Banyan Project
- The Mine Project
- Project Danube
- Free Your Memory
- ShopAunt
- HIE of One
- Partenero
- Serbliss

== See also ==
- Customer relationship management (CRM)
- Personal data service
- Vendor lock-in
- Vested outsourcing
