= Geek Pride Festival =

The Geek Pride Festival was the name of a number of events between 1998 and 2000, organized by Tim McEachern and devoted to computer geek activities and interests. The name of the festival is most often associated with the large event held on March 31 and April 1, 2000, at the Park Plaza Castle in Boston, United States.

Before that, there were two events at the now-closed Big House Brewery in Albany, New York. WAMC, the local NPR affiliate, sponsored the events which were organized by Tim McEachern.

== 2000 event ==
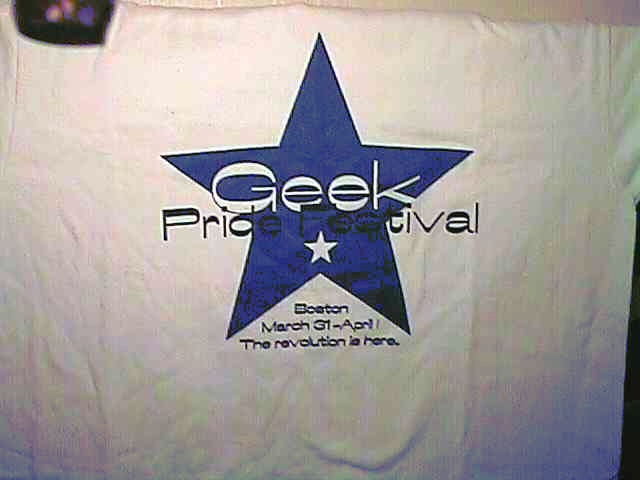
Geek Pride Festival T-shirt

The 2000 event was a major production, organised with the help of Susan Kaup, Chris O'Brien and many volunteers.

The event began Friday night, with a swap meet / social event at the Modern Lounge in Boston's Landsdowne Street nightclub district. Drink tickets were offered at the door, and the DJ played computer-themed music.

On Saturday, the main event occurred at the Castle, where admission was free. The middle of the floor held the "Email Garden", comprising about a dozen tables with PCs running Red Hat Linux, in a wired LAN network and providing email, Web, and general Internet access. At the front of the hall was a stage, which hosted a number of invited guests, including Rob Malda of Slashdot, Eric S. Raymond, Micky Metts of Channel1 ISP, the video game cover band Everyone. The stage was also host to the final round of a Quake III tournament, held in a back room, displayed on the stage's projection screen, as well as the final round of "Stump the Geek", a geek trivia contest.

Aside from the main events, the main floor had computer workstations displaying live webcam feeds of "satellite" Festivals in remote locations. A live Shoutcast feed was also provided of the Boston event. A poll for "greatest geek hero" was also held; the official winner was Alan Turing.

According to Science/AAAS magazine, 2,000 people attended, though the open-door free admission made an official count impossible.

=== Corporate sponsors ===
- VA Linux (now SourceForge, Inc.)
- Andover.net (now OSTG, part of SourceForge)
- SwitcHouse (now Nintari)
- Addison-Wesley
- Newstrolls.com (now defunct)

=== Speakers ===
- Alex Pentland
- Rob Malda
- Keith Dawson, editor of Tasty Bits from the Technology Front
- Eric S. Raymond
- The Cluetrain Manifesto authors Christopher Locke & David Weinberger
- Micky Metts aka [FreeScholar]
- Jeffrey Zeldman
- Dave Green & Danny O'Brien of UK-based ntk.net

== Other events ==
The 2000 event is widely referred to as the "first annual" event, although McEachern organized at least one previous event named Geek Pride Festival (and/or Geek Pride Day) at a bar in Albany, New York. Some sources refer to the Boston event as the third annual.

McEachern planned another event to take place later the same year in San Francisco but was never realized.
