= History of public relations =

Most textbooks date the establishment of the "Publicity Bureau" in 1900 as the start of the modern public relations (PR) profession. Of course, there were many early forms of public influence and communications management in history. Basil Clarke is considered the founder of the PR profession in Britain with his establishment of Editorial Services in 1924. Academic Noel Turnball points out that systematic PR was employed in Britain first by religious evangelicals and Victorian reformers, especially opponents of slavery. In each case the early promoters focused on their particular movement and were not for hire more generally.

Propaganda was used by both sides to rally domestic support and demonize enemies during the First World War. PR activists entered the private sector in the 1920s. Public relations became established first in the U.S. by Ivy Lee or Edward Bernays, then spread internationally. Many American companies with PR departments spread the practice to Europe after 1948 when they created European subsidiaries as a result of the Marshall Plan.

The second half of the twentieth century was the professional development building era of public relations. Trade associations, PR news magazines, international PR agencies, and academic principles for the profession were established. In the early 2000s, press release services began offering social media press releases. The Cluetrain Manifesto, which predicted the impact of social media in 1999, was controversial in its time, but by 2006, the effect of social media and new internet technologies became broadly accepted.

== Ancient origins ==
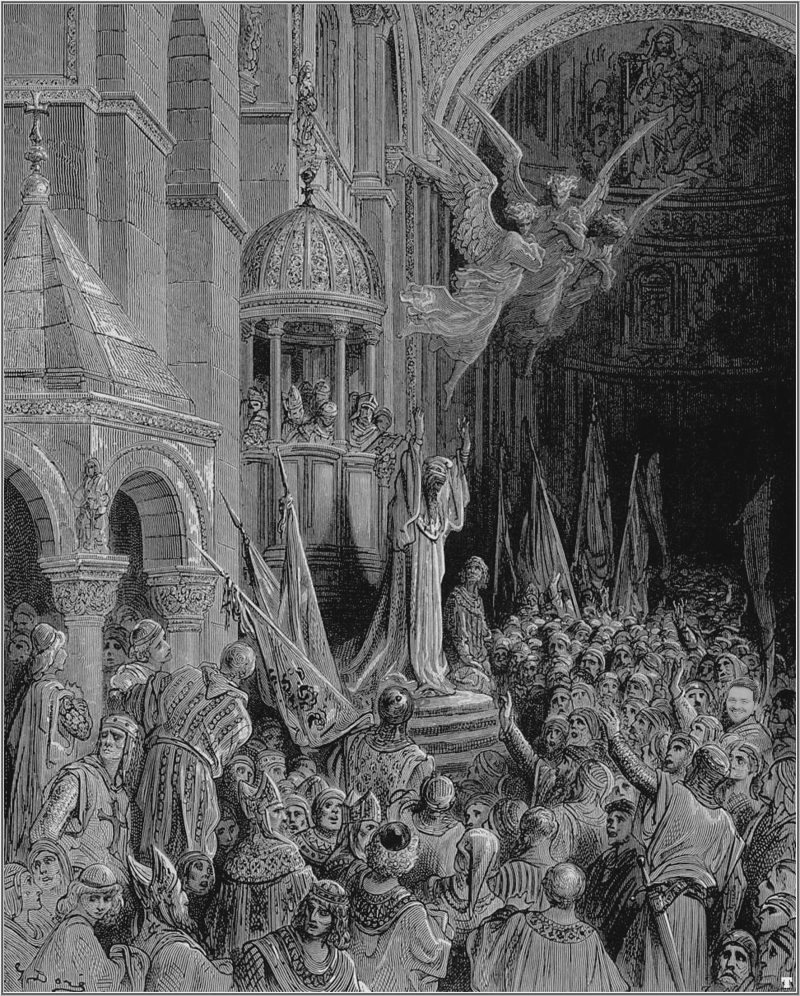
An artistic depiction of a preacher promoting the crusades

Although the term "public relations" was not yet developed, academics like James E. Grunig and Scott Cutlip identified early forms of public influence and communications management in ancient civilizations. According to Edward Bernays, one of the pioneers of PR, "The three main elements of public relations are practically as old as society: informing people, persuading people, or integrating people with people." Scott Cutlip said historic events have been defined as PR retrospectively, "a decision with which many may quarrel."

A clay tablet found in ancient Iraq that promoted more advanced agricultural techniques is sometimes considered the first known example of public relations. Babylonian, Egyptian and Persian leaders created pyramids, obelisks and statues to promote their divine right to lead. Additionally, claims of magic or religious authority were used to persuade the public of a king or pharaoh's right to rule.

Ancient Greek cities produced sophisticated rhetoric, as analyzed by Isocrates, Plato and Aristotle. In Greece there were advocates for hire called "sophists". Plato and others said sophists were dishonest and misled the public, while the book "Public Relations as Communication Management" said they were "largely an ethical lot" that "used the principles of persuasive communication." In Egypt court advisers consulted pharaohs to speak honestly and scribes documented a pharaoh's deeds. In Rome, Julius Caesar wrote the first campaign biography promoting his military successes. He also commissioned newsletters and poems to support his political position. In medieval Europe, craftsmen organized into guilds that managed their collective reputation. In England, Lord Chancellors acted as mediators between rulers and subjects.

Pope Urban II's recruitment for the crusades is also sometimes referred to as a public relations effort. Pope Gregory XV founded the term "propaganda" when he created Congregatio de Propaganda ("congregation for propagating the faith"), which used trained missionaries to spread Christianity. The term did not carry negative connotations until it was associated with government publicity around World War II. In the early 1200s, Magna Carta was created as a result of Stephen Langton lobbying English barons to insist King John recognize the authority of the church.

== Antecedents ==
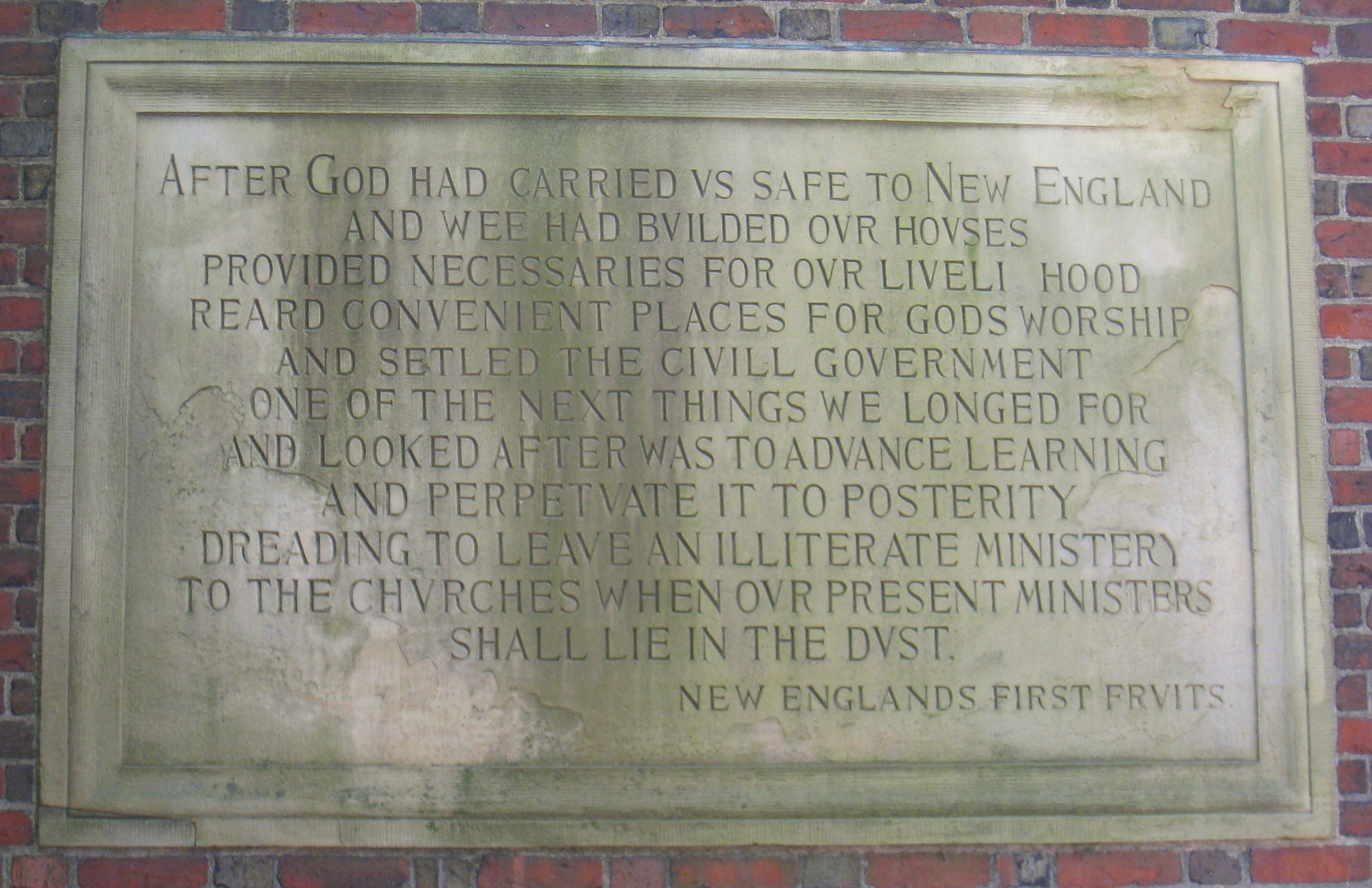
A plaque from Harvard quoting a passage from the fundraising pamphlet, New England's First Fruits

Explorers like Magellan, Columbus used exaggerated claims of grandeur to entice settlers to come to the New World. For example, in 1598, a desolate swampy area of Virginia was described by Captain Arthur Barlowe as follows: "The soil is the most plentiful, sweet, fruitful and wholesome of all the world." When colonists wrote back to Europe about the hardships of colonizing Virginia, including the death toll caused by conflicts with Indians, pamphlets with anonymous authors were circulated to reassure potential settlers and rebuke criticisms.

The first newsletter and the first daily newspaper were founded in Germany in 1609 and 1615 respectively. Cardinal Richelieu of France had pamphlets made that supported his policies and attacked his political opposition. The government also created a publicity bureau called Information and Propaganda and a weekly newspaper originally controlled by the French government, The Gazette. In the mid-1600s both sides of the English Civil War conflict used pamphlets to attack or defend the monarchy respectively. Poet John Milton wrote anonymous pamphlets advocating for ideas such as liberalizing divorce, the establishment of a republic and the importance of free speech. A then-anonymous pamphlet in 1738 by Maria Theresa of the Austrian Empire was influential in criticizing the freemasons and advocating for an alliance between the British, Dutch and Austrian governments.

In 1641, Harvard University sent three preachers to England to raise money for missionary activities among the Indians. To support the fund-raising, the university produced one of the earliest fund-raising brochures, New England's First Fruits. An early version of the press release was used when King's College (now Columbia University), sent out an announcement of its 1758 graduation ceremonies and several newspapers printed the information. Princeton University was the first university to make it a routine practice of supplying newspapers with information about activities at the college.

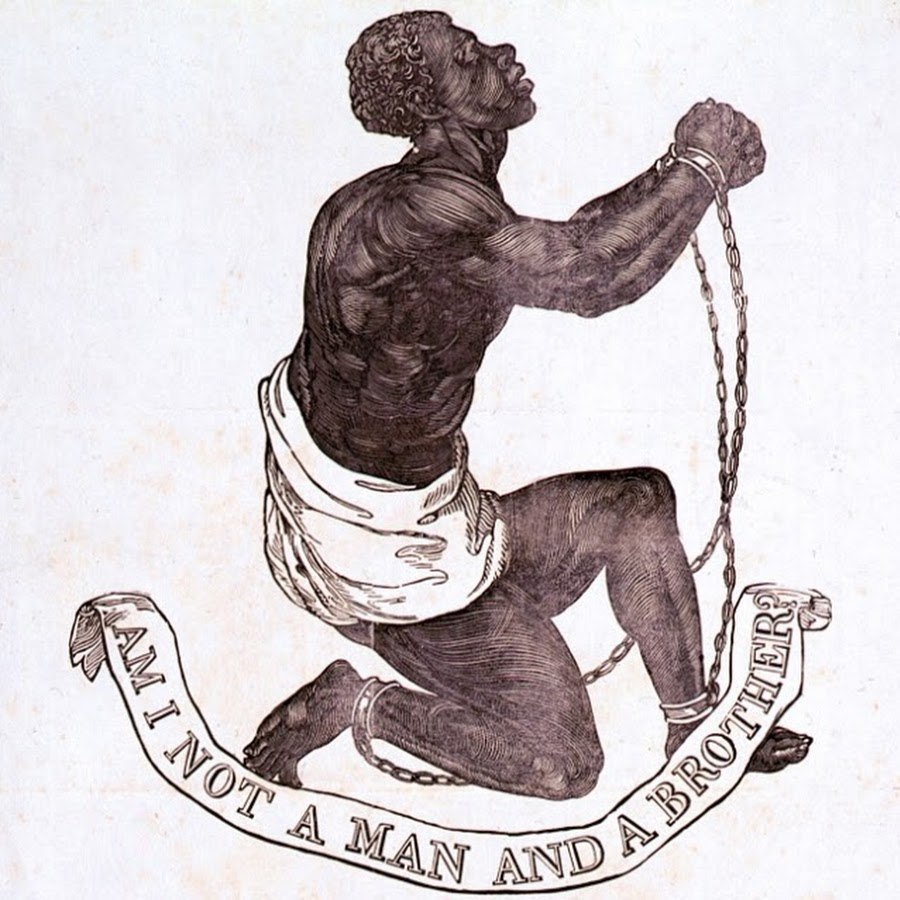
A medallion from 1787 promoting the abolitionist cause

According to Noel Turnbull, an adjunct professor from RMIT University, more systematic forms of PR began as the public started organizing for social and political movements. The Society for Effecting the Abolition of the Slave Trade was established in England in 1787. It published books, posters and hosted public lectures in England advocating against slavery. Industries that relied on slavery attempted to persuade the middle-class that it was necessary and that slaves had humane living conditions. The Slave Trade was abolished in 1807. In the U.S., the movement to abolish slavery began in 1833 with the establishment of the American Anti-Slavery Society, using tactics adopted from the British abolitionist movement. According to Edward Bernays, the U.S. abolitionist movement used "every available device of communication, appeal and action," such as petitions, pamphlets, political lobbying, local societies, and boycotts. The South responded by defending slavery on the basis of economics, religion and the constitution. In some cases propaganda promoting the abolition of slavery was forbidden in The South and abolitionists were killed or jailed. Public relations also played a role in abolitionist movements in France, Australia and in Europe.

The Boston Tea Party has been called a "public relations event" or pseudo event, in that it was a staged event intended to influence the public. Pamphlets such as Common Sense (1775–76) and The American Crisis (1776 to 1783) were used to spread anti-British propaganda in the United States, as well as the slogan "taxation without representation is tyranny." After the revolution was won, disagreements broke out regarding the United States Constitution. Supporters of the constitution sent letters now called the Federalist Papers to major news outlets, which helped persuade the public to support the constitution. Exaggerated stories of Davy Crockett and the California Gold Rush were used to persuade the public to fight the Mexican–American War and to migrate west in the U.S. respectively.

Author Marvin Olasky said public relations in the 1800s was spontaneous and de-centralized. In the 1820s, Americans wanted to disprove the perspective of French aristocrats that the American democracy run by "the mob" had "no sense of history, no sense of gratitude to those who had served it, and no sense of the meaning of 'virtue'". To combat this perception, French aristocrat Marquis de Lafayette, who helped fund the American Revolution, was invited to a tour of the United States. Each community he visited created a committee to welcome him and promote his visit. In the mid-1800s P. T. Barnum founded the American Museum and the Barnum and Bailey Circus. He became well known for publicizing his circus using manipulative techniques. For example, he announced that his museum would exhibit a 161-year-old woman, who had been Washington's nurse, then produced an elderly woman and a forged birth certificate.

In the 1860s, the major railway companies building the Transcontinental Railroad (Central Pacific Railroad in Sacramento, California, and the Union Pacific Railroad in New York City) engaged in "sophisticated and systematic corporate public relations" in order to raise $125 million needed to construct the 1,776-mile-long railroad. To raise the money, the companies needed to maintain "an image attractive to potential bond buyers, [and maintain relationships] with members of Congress, the California state legislature, and federal regulators; with workers and potential workers; and with journalists."

Early environmental campaigning groups like the Coal Abatement Society and the Congo Reform Association were formed in the late-1800s. In the late 1800s many of the now-standard practices of media relations, such as conducting interviews and press conferences emerged. Industrial firms began to promote their public image. The German steel and armaments company Krupp created the first corporate press department in 1870 to write articles, brochures and other communications advertising the firm. The first US corporate PR department was established in 1889 by Westinghouse Electric Corporation. "The first public relations department was created by the inventor and industrialist George Westinghouse in 1889 when he hired two men to publicize his pet project, alternating current (AC) electricity." The first appearance of the term "public relations" was in the 1897 Year Book of Railway Literature.

== Origins as a profession ==
The book Today's Public Relations: An Introduction says that, although experts disagree on public relations' origins, many identify the early 1900s as its beginning as a paid profession. According to Barbara Diggs-Brown, an academic with the American University School of Communication, the PR field anchors its work in historical events in order to improve its perceived validity, but it didn't begin as a professional field until around 1900. Scott Cutlip said, "we somewhat arbitrarily place the beginnings of the public relations vocation with the establishment of The Publicity Bureau in Boston in mid-1900." He explains that the origins of PR cannot be pinpointed to an exact date, because it developed over time through a series of events. Most textbooks on public relations say that it was first developed in the United States, before expanding globally; however, Jacquie L'Etang, an academic from the United Kingdom, said it was developed in the UK and the US simultaneously. Noel Turnball claims it began as a professional field in the eighteenth and nineteenth century with British evangelicals and Victorian reformers. According to academic Betteke Van Ruler, PR activities didn't begin in Continental Europe as a professional field until the 1920s.

According to Goldman, from around 1903 to 1909 "many newspapers and virtually all mass-circulation magazines featured detailed, indignant articles describing how some industry fleeced its stockholders, overcharged the public or corrupted politics." The public became abruptly more critical of big business. The anti-corporate and pro-reform sentiment of the Progressive Era was reflected in newspapers, which were dramatically increasing in circulation as the cost of paper decreased. Public relations was founded, in part, to defend corporate interests against sensational and hyper-critical news articles. It was also influential in promoting consumerism after the emergence of mass production.

=== Early pioneers ===
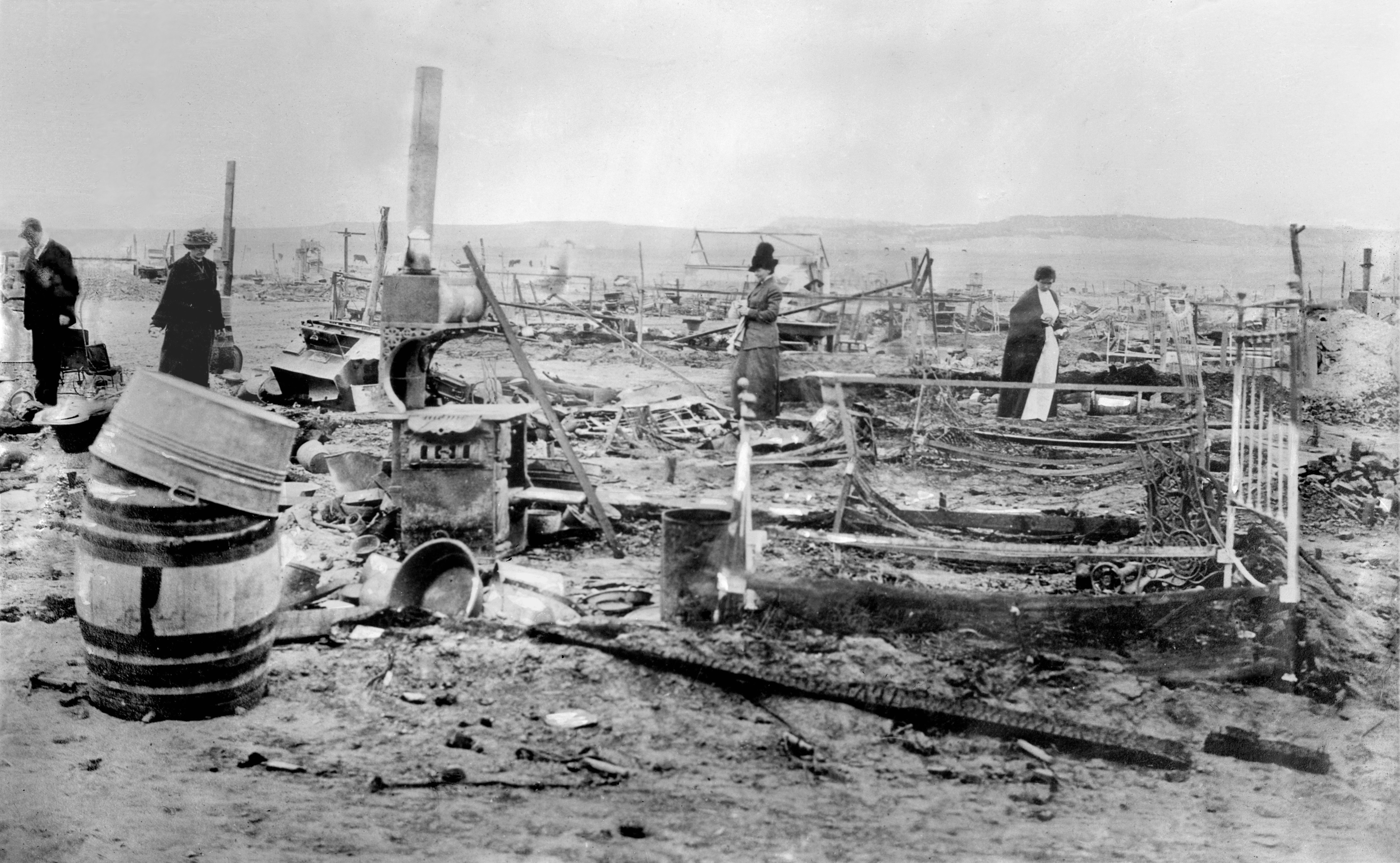
The aftermath of the Ludlow Massacre

The Publicity Bureau was the first PR agency and was founded by former Boston journalists, including Ivy Lee. Ivy Lee is sometimes called the father of PR and was influential in establishing it as a professional practice. In 1906, Lee published a Declaration of Principles, which said that PR work should be done in the open, should be accurate and cover topics of public interest. According to historian Eric Goldman, the declaration of principles marked the beginning of an emphasis on informing, rather than misleading, the public. Ivy Lee is also credited with developing the modern press release and the "two-way-street" philosophy of both listening to and communicating with the public. In 1906, Lee helped facilitate the Pennsylvania Railroad's first positive media coverage after inviting press to the scene of a railroad accident, despite objections from executives. At the time, secrecy about corporate operations was common practice. Lee's work was often identified as spin or propaganda. In 1913 and 1914, the mining union was blaming the Ludlow Massacre, where on-strike miners and their families were killed by state militia, on the Rockefeller family and their coal mining operation, The Colorado Fuel and Iron Company. On the Rockefeller family's behalf, Lee published bulletins called "Facts Concerning the Struggle in Colorado for Industrial Freedom," which contained false and misleading information. Lee warned that the Rockefellers were losing public support and developed a strategy that Junior followed to repair it. It was necessary for Junior to overcome his shyness, go personally to Colorado to meet with the miners and their families, inspect the conditions of the homes and the factories, attend social events, and especially to listen closely to the grievances. This was novel advice, and attracted widespread media attention, which opened the way to resolve the conflict, and present a more humanized versions of the Rockefellers. In response the labor press said Lee "twisted the facts" and called him a "paid liar," a "hired slanderer," and a "poisoner of public opinion." By 1917, Bethlehem Steel company announced it would start a publicity campaign against perceived errors about them. The Y.M.C.A. opened a new press secretary. AT&T and others also started their first publicity programs.

Edward Bernays, a nephew of Sigmund Freud, is also sometimes referred to as the father of PR and the profession's first theorist for his work in the 1920s. He took the approach that audiences had to be carefully understood and persuaded to see things from the client's perspective. He wrote the first textbook on PR and taught the first college course at New York University in 1923. Bernays also first introduced the practice of using front groups in order to protect tobacco interests. In the 1930s he started the first vocational course in PR. Bernays was influenced by Freud's theories about the subconscious. He authored several books, including Crystallizing Public Opinion (1923), Propaganda (1928), and The Engineering of Consent (1947). He saw PR as an "applied social science" that uses insights from psychology, sociology, and other disciplines to scientifically manage and manipulate the thinking and behavior of an irrational and "herdlike" public.

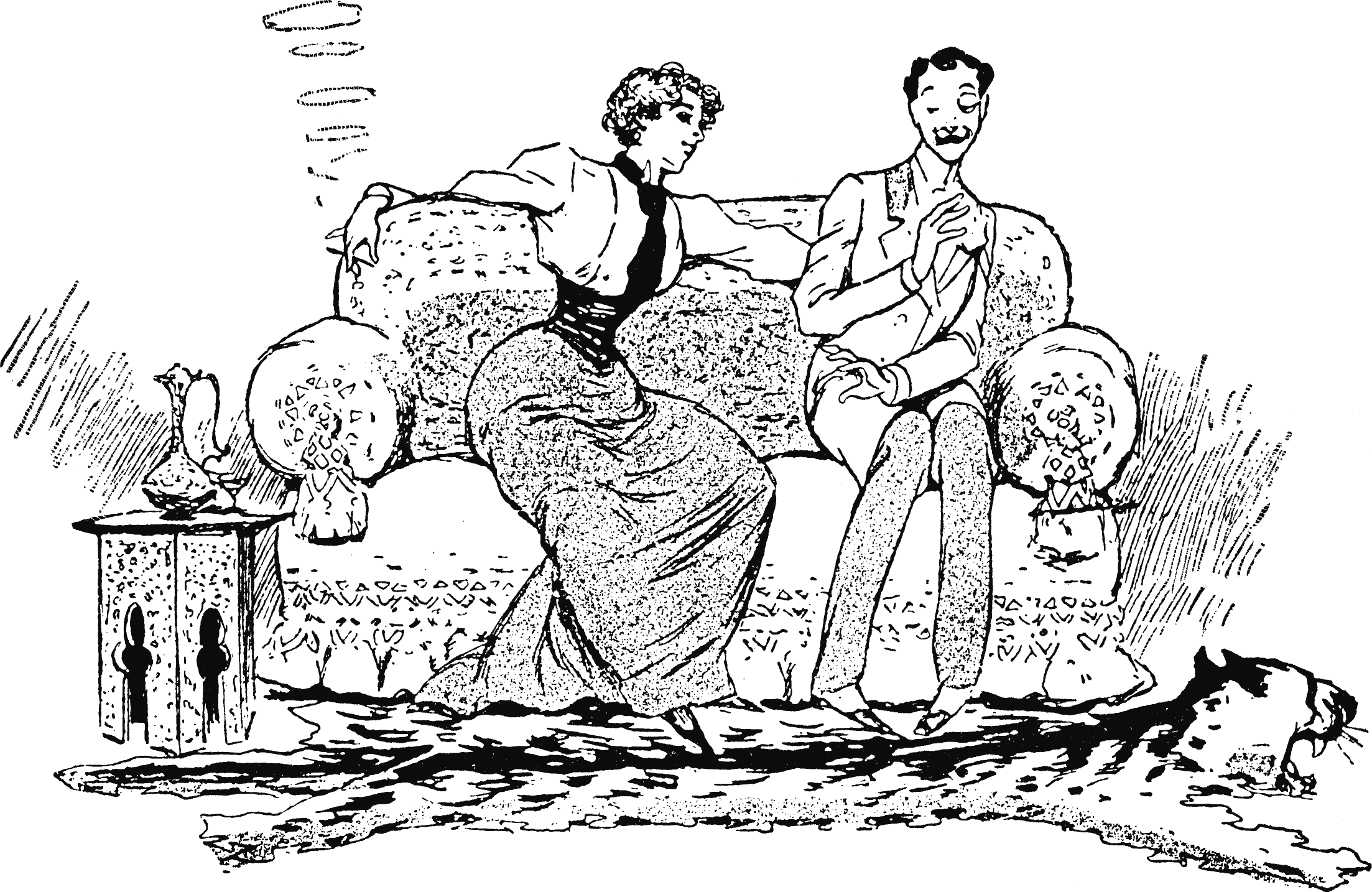
Image showing woman smoking

In 1929, Edward Bernays helped the Lucky Strike cigarette brand increase its sales among the female demographic. Research showed that women were reluctant to carry a pack of Lucky Strike cigarettes, because the brand's green color scheme clashed with popular fashion choices. Bernays persuaded fashion designers, charity events, interior designers and others to popularize the color green. He also positioned cigarettes as Torches of Freedom that represent rebellion against the norms of a male-dominated society.

According to Ruth Edgett from Syracuse University, Lee and Bernays both had "initial and spectacular successes in raising PR from the art of the snake oil salesman to the calling for a true communicator." However, "late in their careers, both Lee and Bernays took on clients with clearly reprehensible values, thus exposing themselves and their work to public criticism." Walter Lippmann was also a contributor to early PR theory, for his work on the books Public Opinion (1922) and The Phantom Public (1925). He coined the term "manufacture of consent," which is based on the idea that the public's consent must be coaxed by experts to support a democratic society.

Former journalist Basil Clarke is considered the founder of PR in the UK. He founded the UK's first PR agency, Editorial Services, in 1924. He also authored the world's first code of ethics for the field in 1929. Clarke wrote that PR, "must look true and it must look complete and candid or its 'credit' is gone". He suggested that the selection of which facts are disseminated by PR campaigns could be used to persuade the public. The longest established UK PR agency is Richmond Towers, founded by Suzanne Richmond and Marjorie Towers in 1930.

Arthur W. Page is sometimes considered to be the father of "corporate public relations" for his work with the American Telephone and Telegraph Company (AT&T) from 1927 to 1946. The company was experiencing resistance from the public to its monopolization efforts. In the early 1900s, AT&T had assessed that 90 percent of its press coverage was negative, which was reduced to 60 percent by changing its business practices and disseminating information to the press. According to business historian John Brooks, Page positioned the company as a public utility and increased the public's appreciation for its contributions to society. On the other hand, Stuart Ewen writes that AT&T used its advertising dollars with newspapers to manipulate its coverage and had their PR team write feature stories imitating independent journalism.

=== Early campaigns ===
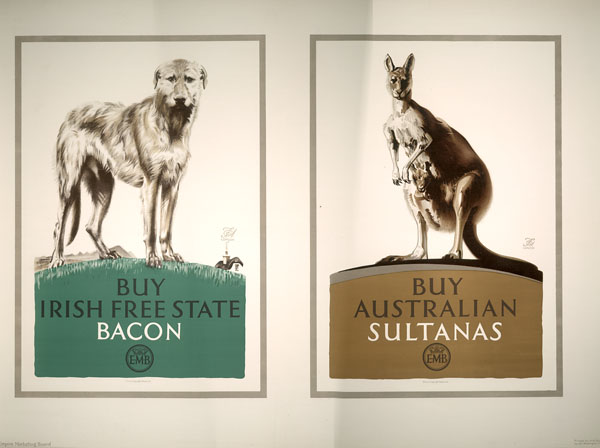
Empire Marketing Board poster

Edward Clarke and Bessie Tyler were influential in growing the Ku Klux Klan to four million members over three years using publicity techniques in the early 1920s. In 1926 the Empire Marketing Board was formed by the British government in part to encourage a preference for goods produced in Britain. It folded in 1933 due to government cuts. In 1932, a pamphlet "The Projection of England" advocated for the importance of England managing its reputation domestically and abroad. The Ministry of Information was established in the UK in 1937.

Franklin Delano Roosevelt and Woodrow Wilson were the first Presidents to emphasize the use of publicity. In the 1930s Roosevelt used the media to promote The New Deal and to blame corporations for the country's economic problems. This led companies to recruit their own publicists to defend themselves. Roosevelt's anti-trust efforts led corporations to attempt to persuade the public and lawmakers "that bigger [corporations] was not necessarily more evil." Wilson used the media to promote his government reform program, The New Freedom. He formed the Committee on Public Information.

In the 1930s, the National Association of Manufacturers was one of the first to create a major campaign promoting capitalism and pro-business viewpoints. It lobbied against unions, The New Deal and the 8-hour work-day. NAM tried mostly unsuccessfully to convince the public that the interests of the public were aligned with corporate interests and to create an association between commerce and democratic principles. During the Second World War, Coca-Cola promised that "every man in uniform gets a bottle of Coca-Cola for five cents, wherever he is and whatever it costs the company." The company persuaded politicians that it was crucial to the war-effort and was exempted from sugar rationing. During the European Recovery Program PR became more established in Europe as US-based companies with PR departments created European subsidiaries.

In 1938, amid concerns regarding dropping diamond prices and sales volume, De Beers and its advertising agency N.W. Ayers adopted a strategy to "strengthen the association in the public's mind of diamonds with romance," whereas "the larger and finer the diamond, the greater the expression of love." This became known as one of America's "lexicon of great campaigns" for successfully persuading the public to purchase expensive luxury items during a time of financial stress through psychological manipulation. It also led to the development of the slogan "A diamond is forever" in 1947 and was influential in how diamonds were marketed thereafter. After World War I the first signs of public relations as a profession began in France and became more established through the Marshall Plan.

== Wartime propaganda ==
=== World War I ===
1914 "Lord Kitchener Wants You!" poster

The first organized, large-scale propaganda campaigns were during World War I. Germany created the German Information Bureau to create pamphlets, books and other communications that were intended to support the justness of their cause, to encourage voluntary recruitment, to demonize the enemy and persuade America to remain neutral in the conflict. In response to learning about Germany's propaganda, the British created a war propaganda agency called the Wellington House in September 1914. Atrocity stories, both real and alleged, were used to incite hatred for the enemy, especially after the "Rape of Belgium" in 1915. France created a propaganda agency in 1914. Publicity in Australia led to a lift in the government's ban on military drafts. Austria-Hungary used propaganda tactics to attack the credibility of Italy's leadership and its motives for war. Italy in-turn created the Padua Commission in 1918, which led Allied propaganda against Austria-Hungary.

One week after the United States declared war on Germany in 1917, US President Woodrow Wilson established the US propaganda agency, the Committee on Public Information (Creel Commission), as an alternative to demands for media censorship by the US army and navy. The CPI spread positive messages to present an upbeat image about the war and denied fraudulent atrocities made up to incite anger for the enemy. The CPI recruited about 75,000 "Four Minute Men," volunteers who spoke about the war at social events for four minutes.

As a result of World War I propaganda, there was a shift in PR theory from a focus on factual argumentation to one of emotional appeals and the psychology of the crowd. The term "propaganda" which was originally associated with religion and the church, became a more widely known concept.

=== World War II ===
Propaganda did not develop a negative connotation until it was used in Nazi propaganda for World War II. Even though Germany's World War I propaganda was considered more advanced than that of other nations, Adolf Hitler said that propaganda had been under-utilized and claimed that superior British propaganda was the main reason for losing the war. Nazi Germany created the Ministry of Public Enlightenment and Propaganda in March 1933, just after Nazis took power. The Nazi party took editorial control over newspapers, created their own news organizations and established Nazi-controlled news organizations in conquered regions. The Nazi party used posters, films, books and public speakers among other tactics.

According to historian Zbyněk Zeman, broadcasting became the most important medium for propaganda throughout the war. Posters were also used domestically and leaflets were dropped behind enemy lines by air-ship. In regions conquered by Germany, citizens could be punished by death for listening to foreign broadcasts. Britain had four organizations involved in propaganda and was methodical about understanding its audiences in different countries. US propaganda focused on fighting for freedom and the connection between war efforts and industrial production. Soviet posters also focused on industrial production.

In countries where citizens are subordinate to the government, aggressive propaganda campaigns continued during peacetime, while liberal democratic nations primarily use propaganda techniques to support war efforts.

== Professional development ==
According to historian Eric Goldman, by the 1940s public relations was being taught at universities and was a professional occupation relied on in a similar way as lawyers and doctors. However, it failed to obtain complete recognition as a profession due in part to a history of deceit. Author Marvin Olasky said in 1987 that the reputation of the profession was getting worse, while Robert L. Heath from the University of Houston said in 1991 that it was progressing toward "true professional status." Academic J. A. R. Pimlott said it had achieved "quasi-professionalism." Heath said despite the field's newfound professionalism and ethics, its reputation was still effected by a history of exploitive behavior.

The number of media outlets increased and PR talent from wartime propaganda entered the private sector. The practice of public relations became ubiquitous to reach political, activist and corporate objectives. The development of the press into a more real-time media also led to heightened scrutiny of public relations activities and those they represent. For example, Richard Nixon was criticized for "doubletalk" and "stonewalling" in his PR office's responses to the Watergate scandal.

Trade associations were formed first in the U.S. in 1947 with the Public Relations Society of America (PRSA), followed by the Institute of Public Relations (now the Chartered Institute of Public Relations) in London in 1948. Similar trade associations were created in Australia, Europe, South Africa, Italy and Singapore. The International Association of Public Relations was founded in 1955. The Institute for Public Relations held its first conference in 1949 and that same year the first British book on PR, "Public Relations and publicity" was published by J.H. Brebner. The Foundation for Public Relations Research and Education (now the Institute for Public Relations) was founded in 1956. The International Association of Business Communicators was founded in 1970. Betsy Ann Plank is called "the first lady of public relations" for becoming the first female president of the PRSA in 1973.

Two of today's largest PR firms, Edelman and Burson-Marsteller, were founded in 1952 and 1953 respectively. Daniel Edelman created the first media tour in the 1950s by touring the country with "the Toni Twins," where one had used a professional salon and the other had used Toni's home-care products. It was also during this period that trade magazines like PR Week, Ragans and PRNews were founded. John Hill, founder of Hill & Knowlton, is known as the first international PR pioneer. Hill & Knowlton was the first major U.S. firm to create a strong international network in the 1960s and 1970s. Both Edelman and Burson-Marsteller followed Hill & Knowlton by establishing operations in London in the 1960s and all three began competing internationally in Asia, Europe and other regions. Jacques Coup de Frejac was influential in persuading U.S. and UK companies to also extend their PR efforts into the French market and for convincing French businesses to engage in PR activities. In the early 2000s, PR in Latin America began developing at a pace "on par with industrialized nations."

According to The Global Public Relations Handbook, public relations evolved from a series of "press agents or publicists" to a manner of theory and practice in the 1980s. Research was published in academic journals like Public Relations Review and the Journal of Public Relations Research. This led to an industry consensus to categorize PR work into a four-step process: research, planning, communication and action.

== Social and digital ==
During the 1990s specialties for communicating to certain audiences and within certain market segments emerged, such as investor relations or technology PR. New internet technology and social media websites effected PR strategies and tactics. In April 1999, four managers from IBM, Sun Microsystems, National Public Radio and Linux Journal created "The Cluetrain Manifesto." The Manifesto established 95 theses about the way social media and internet technologies were going to change business. It concluded that markets had become "smarter and faster than most companies," because stakeholders were getting information from each other. The Manifesto "created a storm" with strong detractors and supporters. That same year, Seth Godin published a book on permission marketing, which advocated against advertising and in favor of marketing that is useful and educational. While initially controversial, by 2006 it became commonly accepted that social media had an important role in public relations.

Press releases, which were mostly unchanged for more than a century, began to integrate digital features. BusinessWire introduced the "Smart News Release," which incorporated audio, video and images, in 1997. This was followed by the MultiVu multimedia release from PR Newswire in 2001. The Social Media Release was created by Todd Defren from Shift Communications in 2006 in response to a blog written by journalist and blogger Tom Foremski titled "Die! Press release! Die! Die! Die!" Incorporating digital and social features became a norm among wire services, and companies started routinely making company announcements on their corporate blog.

According to the New York Times, corporate communications shifted from a monologue to two-way conversational communications and new media also made it "easier for consumers to learn about the mix-ups and blunders" of PR. For example, after the Deepwater Horizon oil spill, BP tried to deflect blame to other parties, claim the spill was not as significant as it was and focused on the science, while human interest stories related to the damage were emerging. In 2011, Facebook tried to covertly spread privacy concerns about competitor Google's Social Circles. Chapstick created a communications crisis after allegedly, repeatedly deleting negative comments on its Facebook page. During the Iraq War, it was exposed that the US created false radio personalities to spread pro-American information and paid Iraqi newspapers to write articles written by American troops.

== See also ==
- History of advertising
- History of advertising in Britain
