= Social business model =

The social business model is use of social media tools and social networking behavioral standards by businesses for communication with customers, suppliers, and others.

Combining social networking etiquette (being helpful, transparent and authentic) with business engagement on LinkedIn (for one-to-one interaction), Twitter (for immediacy) and Facebook (for content sharing) more fully involves employees in the organization and increases customer intimacy and trust.

== Overview ==
Traditional business models, particularly in large organizations, have had as one common characteristic careful limitation of direct contact between those within the organization and those outside of it. Only certain specific individuals (most frequently in roles such as sales, customer service and field consulting) were designated as "customer-facing" personnel.

Organizations further limited outside access to internal employees through filtering mechanisms such as publishing only a main switchboard number (whether routed through a live receptionist or an interactive voice response system) and generic "sales@" or "info@" email addresses.

The Cluetrain Manifesto (written by Rick Levine, Christopher Locke, Doc Searls, and David Weinberger and published in 1999) was among the first books to predict the demise of this old order and the emergence of more open business models, though most of the business world was slow to adopt the book's recommended cultural changes.

Thirteen years later, authors Dion Hinchcliffe and Peter Kim added structural underpinnings to the cultural shifts outlined in The Cluetrain Manifesto in their book, Social Business by Design. The book details many of the ways social media tools and practices are being adopted within organizations, to support both internal employee collaboration and external customer engagement (which the authors describe as the "bigger problem").

== Elements ==
In implementing the social business model, organizations apply social networking protocols and tools in a range of areas, potentially including:

- Marketing
- Customer Support
- Recruiting
- Crowdsourcing
- Internal employee collaboration
- Sales
- Product Development
- Supply Chain Operations
- Investor Relations

== Characteristics of organizations adopting the social business model ==
Organizations that fully adopt the social business model will exhibit four key characteristics:

- Connected – employees will be able to seamlessly engage one-on-one in real-time with other employees and individuals outside the organization (customers, prospects, partners, media, etc.) using a variety of communications methods including text chat, voice, file sharing, email, and video chat.
- Social – employees will follow social networking etiquette (being authentic, helpful and transparent) in external interactions. The focus will be on answering questions and providing information rather than overt sales or promotion.
- Presence – these conversations may originate on the company's website or elsewhere online (e.g., publication websites, industry portals, or social networking sites such as LinkedIn or Facebook).
- Intelligent – organizations will use in-depth analytics to monitor connections, social interactions and presence; measure corresponding business results; and continually adjust and improve practices for increased effectiveness.

== Technical and functional requirements ==
While much of the change inherent in adopting the social business model is cultural, it also requires process changes enabled by social business technology. Functional requirements for a social business technology platform include:

- Analytics (including the cost of engagement as well as various measures of return on investment such as leads, sales, referrals, recommendations, and retained customers).
- Integration with other social media and business tools such as CRM systems, partner relationship management (PRM) software, product development, website analytics, and employee-recruiting applications.
- Rules-based workflow (e.g. routing a comment to the appropriate individual for a response, based on content).
- Geolocation (so customers or prospects can be automatically routed to local sales or customer service representatives).
- Content sharing.
- Collaboration tools.
- Transparency (i.e., people should know who they are engaging with)
- Unified communications (the ability to engage via voice, text, video, email, and share a wide variety of file types)
- Storage (the ability to store interactions for legal, training, compliance or compensation purposes, and purge stored data when no longer needed based on company policy or regulatory requirements).
- Immediacy (real-time monitoring and response).

== See also ==
- New media
- Social enterprise
- Social media
- Social media marketing
- Social network
- Social network analysis
- Social web
