= Social employee =

Worker operating within a social business model

A social employee is a worker operating within a social business model. Following an organization's social computing guidelines, social employees use social media tools both for internal workflow and collaboration purposes and for external engagement with customers, prospects and stakeholders through a combination of social media marketing, content marketing, social marketing, and social selling. Social employee programs are considered to be as much about culture and engagement as they are about business processes and best practices. In addition to increased leads and sales, social employee best practices are said to improve business outcomes important to social media marketing, such as increased connections and web traffic, improved brand identification and "chatter", and better customer advocacy.

== Overview ==
The term "social employee" was first introduced to describe those exhibiting the emerging characteristics of workers operating under a social business model.

The term is often used interchangeably with similar designations like "employee advocate" or "social employee advocate".

Crucial to the perceived value of the social employee is the concept of the digital footprint. While organizations are able to generate large bases of followers through social media, research shows that brand marketing and engagement efforts through these networks are not as effective as those of individual employees. In fact, some research indicates that employee experts are more trusted than any other member of an organization. Because of this, social employee programs are designed to train, empower, and support employee engagement efforts in the hopes of authentically engaging larger communities, increasing the frequency of shares, reviews, and other forms of "earned media" and expanding the brand's presence on the web.

== The personal or employee brand ==
A foundational concept of the social employee is the idea of the personal or employee brand. This concept first gained popular attention in a 1997 FastCompany article by business leader Tom Peters titled "The Brand Called You". In the article, Peters argued that the premium placed on branding impacted workers' lives to such an extent that creating and cultivating a distinct personal brand had become a professional necessity. According to Peters, doing so built trust, loyalty, visibility, influence, and employability.

With increased adoption of social media tools by both businesses and consumers in the early 21st century, many business leaders became increasingly concerned with social engagement, both internally among employees and externally with customers and other stakeholders. While many in the business community acknowledged the potential social tools had for improved collaboration, productivity, and brand messaging, the concern that employees would misrepresent their brand, disclose proprietary information, or otherwise damage their company's reputation or ability to conduct business persisted.

As a result, many began to advocate for employee branding as a solution to this problem. This helped give new meaning to the concept of brand ambassadorship, positioning everyday employees in public, and potentially high-profile, engagement roles.

== Characteristics ==
=== Engaged ===
Because social employee advocacy is dependent on the perceived authenticity of the employee, engagement is highly valued in social organizations. Further, data show the measurable impact of employee engagement on organizational productivity and profitability:

- Happy employees were found to be 12 percent more productive.
- In one study, engaged employees were found to be 38 percent more likely to produce at above-average rates. In another, organizations with engaged employees had a 19 percent higher than average shareholder return, while organizations with disengaged employees experienced shareholder return that was 44 percent below average.
- Engaged companies were found to outperform disengaged companies by up to 202 percent.
- Companies with strong focus on culture were found to have an average 13.9 percent turnover rate, while those with a low focus experience were found to have a 48.4 percent turnover rate.

=== Flexible job environment and work–life balance ===
The number of professionals working mobile or remote has risen considerably since 2010. While estimates vary, one study found that number of organizations with mobile or remote employees is expected to rise from 24 percent in 2012 to 89 percent by 2020. Other research has estimated that by 2020, 105.4 million professionals will work remotely in America, about 72.3 percent of the total workforce.

This change has been linked to a rise in social technologies, including biometrics, wearables, near-field communications, and augmented reality. Social employees have also put a greater emphasis on work–life balance, with many believing that advances in technology can directly support efforts in this area. Purported benefits of this shift include a more flexible workforce, reduced business costs, and greater organizational leverage in attracting and retaining top talent.

=== Buys into the brand's story ===
In 2009, thought leader Simon Sinek presented a speech called "How Great Leaders Inspire Action" at a TEDxPugetSound event. Sinek's central argument in this speech was, "People don't buy what you do. They buy why you do it." This concept—that the story behind a business or product offering is a more compelling sales tool than the product itself—is frequently cited in social media marketing as a way to build authentic connections with stakeholders. However, others have argued that for employees to share a brand's story authentically, they must be engaged in that story themselves, and as a result, many companies have made storytelling part of their culture programs.

=== Collaborative ===
An implicit tenet in social business is that social technologies aren't a barrier to productivity, but rather a path to increased connectivity. The shift in enterprise software systems like IBM Connections to incorporate social communication models, such as mentions, wikis, and newsfeeds, reflects the changing communication dynamics within business. With an increase in diversity and sophistication in collaborative software platforms, social organizations have sought to find new creative ways to utilize these tools and secure employee buy-in around them.

Crowdsourcing has also become popular in social businesses. Examples include AT&T's program The Innovation Pipeline (TIP), begun in 2009, which has generated over 28,000 ideas that have led to over 75 projects with funding exceeding $44 million. IBM has also put considerable resources into such processes, producing its social computing guidelines through employee crowdsourcing, as well as its Connections platform through the Technology Adoption Program (TAP), a more formalized crowdsourcing initiative.

Another popular form of internal collaboration is the hack day, or hackathon. Organizations such as Netflix, Facebook, and IBM use hack days to pull employees out of their day-to-day work environments and encourage them to collaborate in nontraditional ways in an attempt to drive disruptive innovation.

Social employees are often encouraged to seek external collaboration opportunities with customers and prospects. For example, Procter & Gamble introduced the Live Well Collaborative to connect with external stakeholders and develop products and services for the 50+ demographic.

=== Social listener ===
A social listener is someone who engages in social listening, or social media monitoring, for professional means. Social employees can use social media monitoring for a variety of reasons, including professional development, industry news and trends, and gauging market sentiment. Some have argued that social listening is one of the most important components of social business, as it enables organizations to collect rich market data, make more informed strategic decisions, and respond to customer needs more authentically.

=== Customer-centric ===
Advocates of customer-centricity in social business argue that social media has changed the dynamic from one-way brand messaging to shared interactions between brand and customer. Brand and customer engagement is seen as a means of creating more lasting connections with customers and prospects and empowering them to become brand promoters. Customer-centric interactions are seen to have distinct value to brands, as research shows that prospects are far more likely to trust brand-related messaging from a friend or family member than they are from a brand.

As a means of building social employees, some social advocates have also called for a broader definition of customer to include the employees themselves. In the book The Pursuit of Social Business Excellence, authors Vala Afshar and Brad Martin made the following argument:

A social business operates with the guiding principle that each employee's responsibility is to serve one another, and that those we serve, even internally, are our customers. To earn internal customer trust and loyalty, each employee must be dependable, available, responsive, and committed to the success of the whole.

=== Adaptable ===
The relatively quick proliferation and prioritization of social media in business has driven a need for organizations to be more flexible and responsive. This in turn has led to a reprioritization of employee skill sets in which adaptability, self-directed learning, and organizational sharing are highly valued.

== Common features of social employee programs ==
According to Weber Shandwick, 47 percent of employees are either already prepared to advocate for their employers or willing to learn. Of those, 21 percent are what the study refers to as "ProActivists," or early adopters, employees who actively use social media for professional purposes, with about half of this group already posting about their employer through social channels.

=== Pilot program ===
Many organizations begin with a social employee pilot program to determine best practices suitable to their organizational structure. Program design depends in part on the size of the organization and the desired scope of social adoption. For instance, whereas Domo implemented a mandatory pilot program requiring the participation of all its staff, Dell recruited approximately 200 employee participants through what was called the Social Media and Communities (SMaC) University.

==== Discovery ====
A common first step in a social employee pilot program is an initial process of discovery in which organizations attempt to identify and quantify their current resources. This can include a roll call of employee early adopters, an internal audit of informal adoption of social tools and practices, or a skills test to determine current adoption rates.

==== Social computing policy ====
Many organizations will recruit employees to actively participate in designing the pilot program. A fundamental concern of social media use in business has been its potential for abuse—specifically regarding the release of confidential information, negative or off-brand messages, and security risks. Because of this, one focus in many social employee pilot programs has been to establish a set of social media guidelines. For example, IBM created an internal wiki and invited employees to help build a document laying out acceptable social engagement guidelines.

==== Training ====
To social organizations, social employee training helps to unify employee programs and tools throughout the organization and establishes a common knowledge base and set of best practices to assist employees in sharing and decision-making. Many organizations us a combination of in-person training, digital learning modules, and social learning principles.

Social employee training often applies the 70/20/10 learning model as its basis. In this model, 70 percent of learning is self-directed, 20 percent is informal mentoring or coaching, and 10 percent is formal training. Applying this dynamic, many organizations work to design a "digital learning experience" in which employees can access learning modules and other subject-specific content to help them acquire new skills.

Training is often divided into mandatory basic skills modules and optional advanced skills modules. To determine what social knowledge an employee needs, a baseline or "social IQ" test is often administered. Many organizations, such as Adobe with its Center of Excellence (CoE) and Dell with its SMaC University, have expanded their training programs to establish a more permanent resource for employees.

Because social employee best practices affect organizational practice and culture in a broad way, upper management and executives are also encouraged to adopt social engagement best practices. Doing so is said to help drive buy-in among the workforce and reinforce organizational commitment to the program. Training for upper management and executives can often involve a process known as "reverse mentoring," in which a lower-level employee is brought in to help develop a senior-level manager's skills and basic digital literacy.

=== Social engagement and content marketing ===
Social engagement and sharing through both internal and external channels are considered key components of social employee design. Employees are encouraged to communicate with coworkers, customers, prospects, and stakeholders through social channels by sharing industry-related news or user-generated content.

Internally, this process is often centered on keeping employees updated on company and industry news, helping employees collaborate on projects, and building culture. Many enterprise-level social platforms have been developed to facilitate such objectives, including task management platforms, wikis, file-sharing tools, and messaging services.

Externally, the focus is often on customer engagement, often through content marketing practices. Research has shown that social sharing can have a positive impact on metrics such as brand engagement, web traffic, and sales. The advent of digital commerce has led customers to research products more thoroughly before make a purchase decision, using social reviews, peer recommendations, and product-specific content to help guide their decisions. Because of the value of peer recommendations specifically, a primary of goal of content marketing is to encourage customers and prospects to share the content among their personal networks as a form of "earned" advocacy.

Another popular social engagement strategy with stakeholders is resharing advocate-generated content through branded channels. This is believed to strengthen relationships with stakeholders and help to humanize the brand.

=== Assessment ===
Measuring the success social employee advocacy programs has presented a challenge to many organizations. While a small percentage of organizations assert that they are able to measure and validate their investment in social marketing, a larger percentage is either only qualitatively aware of the success of their social efforts or unable to measure whatsoever.

Social business thought leaders argue that assessing the success of social employee programs must take into account more than financial return on investment (ROI). Companies that consider a broader set of metrics than financial return often measure success through a variety of key performance indicators:

- Number of employee profile views and connections
- Number of leads from social channels
- Rate at which employee network grows
- Frequency of shares and interactions
- Increase in online "chatter" about a brand
- Ability to attract and retain skilled talent
- Increases in visibility, inbound web traffic, brand recognition, and brand loyalty

Many organizations, however, do report financial benefits as well. Social employees are more likely to exceed their sales quota, and social businesses in general are more likely to see increased sales leads and increase in revenues.

=== Gamification, engagement, and culture-building programs ===
Culture-building programs vary in scope and complexity, but all use social media in some way to underscore employee, departmental, or organizational accomplishments. Program leaders will issue social engagement challenges to help employees meet goals. Challenges can include number of connections (i.e., likes or follows, retweets), number of leads, or frequency of posts (i.e., status updates, tweets, blogs, etc.). For a more competitive element, some organizations will employ gamification strategies such as leaderboards, achievement badges, and scavenger hunts.

== See also ==
- Content marketing
- Engagement marketing
- Enterprise social software
- Integrated marketing communications
- Organizational culture
- Reputation management
- Social business model
- Social marketing
- Social media
- Social media optimization
- Social selling
