= Chris Locke =

Chris Locke may refer to:

- Christopher Locke, an American business analyst and writer,
- Chris Locke, a Canadian comedian and actor.
