= Spring Place (club) =

U.S. members only club

Spring Place is a members only club with locations in New York and Beverly Hills. Membership is selective and aimed at those interested in networking with fellow members in adjacent industries. It was founded by Francesco Costa, Alessandro Cajrati Crivelli and Imad Izemrane in 2016.

The primary location is at 6 Saint Johns Ln. in New York's Tribeca neighborhood. The company operates two clubs, with their second location at 9800 Wilshire Boulevard, Beverly Hills, California.

== History and ownership ==
Spring Place's first location opened in downtown Manhattan, as an extension of its sister company Spring Studios, a multimedia agency and event space. Their second location in Beverly Hills opened October 2018. For founders Francesco Costa, Alessandro Cajrati Crivelli and Imad Izemrane the idea of a physical hub was important as a way for young creatives in fashion, art, entertainment, design, and other adjoining industries, to meet and connect in major cities with brands and executives. Costa felt it necessary because these communities travel frequently to major cities.

After working as CEO from 2016-2019, Costa was appointed co-chairman of Spring Place. Starting January 29, 2019, Olivier Lordonnois became the new chief executive officer, taking on responsibilities formerly handled by Costa. Since opening, Spring Place has hosted IMG Models New York Fashion Week, Tribeca Film Festival, and the Independent Art Fair. The Club's members and founders include Gucci CEO Marco Bizzarri, President & CEO of the CFDA Steven Kolb, and Revolve CEO Michael Mente.

== Membership club ==
Every member is vetted by the Spring Place Membership Committee. Both the New York City and Beverly Hills clubs host a series of events and cultural programming, ranging from performances to panel discussions, all led by creative professionals.

== Coworking space ==
Spring Place's coworking space provides a collaborative workspace connecting work, leisure, and entertainment for a global community of entrepreneurs.

== Architecture and design ==
=== Spring Place New York ===
As part of the 140,000 square foot Spring Studios, Spring Place comprises 64,000 square feet and its interiors were outfitted by Bluarch Architecture. In 2016, the newly opened Spring Place by Bluarch was the Best of the Year Winner for Bar/Lounge by Interior Design (magazine).

=== Spring Place Beverly Hills ===
Spring Place's Los Angeles club consists of 40,000 square feet in Beverly Hills, with a 6,500 square-foot rooftop. The space includes a coworking space, private offices, private dining rooms, open hot desks, lounges, showroom space, and phone booths. Interior design was led by wHY Architecture's founding partner and creative director Kulapat Yantrasast.
