= Recycling Lives =

British waste management company

Recycling Lives Limited, formerly Recycling Co Ltd and Preston Recycling Ltd, is a British recycling and waste management company headquartered in Preston, Lancashire. It has over 200 employees and £25 million turnover. The company founded a social welfare charity, Recycling Lives Charity, and is committed to undertaking only commercial ventures with a demonstrable charity or community benefit.

Recycling Lives Limited was founded by entrepreneur Steven Jackson, who was recognised for his services to employment and the community in Lancashire in the 2013 New Year Honours list.

== Recycling and waste management operations ==
Recycling Lives undertakes a broad range of commercial services for commercial and domestic clients, and public sector organisations. These services include the recycling of scrap metal, end-of-life vehicles, car batteries, waste electrical and electronic equipment (WEEE) including CRTs and FPDs, glass and plastics.

The company also offers skip and container hire and waste collection services via the SkipHireNetwork and BulkyWaste websites. They operate a centre for the public to bring in waste and their eBay shop sells salvaged flat panel display parts.

== History ==
Recycling Co Ltd was incorporated on 2 Jun 1999 as company number 03783452 in Berkely Street, Preston. Recycling Lives Limited itself was founded in 2008 following the acquisition of Preston Recycling Limited; changing it into the new social business model in order to provide initial commercial momentum and revenue.

In 2009, Recycling Lives Limited opened its first Recycling Lives Centre to members of the public and charity residents after being completed in the previous December. The following year, the company was awarded the Queen’s Award for Enterprise in Sustainable Development. This was due to, in part, the welfare work such as furniture 'up-cycling' with residents and Shabby2Chic CIC.

In March 2011, the firm established the first fully dedicated Flat Panel Display (FPD) recycling centre in England, costing £250,000. This is despite concerns from industry body WRAP about the dangers of mercury in such facilities. It also launched its eBay shop, enabling the company to sell working parts from dismantled FPD units as it prioritises reuse over recycling.

In 2012, Recycling Lives was featured as a case study in a report by the Department for Work and Pensions, entitled "Social Justice: Transforming Lives". Following the ban on cash payments for scrap metal, and the subsequent introduction of the Scrap Metal Dealers Act in 2013, which requires all scrap dealers to be licensed by their local authorities, Recycling Lives developed a top-up trade card system for scrap metal transactions. Similar in use to credit and debit cards, the card allows scrap metal sellers to be paid directly, and can also be used to pay for goods/services and withdraw cash from cash points. Also in 2013, Recycling Lives Limited launched a new scheme, developing FPD processing lines at the Kirkham prison. The scheme gives prisoners the opportunity to learn new skills and earn a wage, while improving local rates of FPD recycling and reducing unnecessary transportation of recyclable materials.

The same year saw the Recycling Lives UK charity enter into a 15-year contract with Chorley Borough Council to jointly occupy the Council’s Bengal Street site and establish scrap metal buying and WEEE recycling facilities there. Planning permission has also been submitted for the conversion of the existing offices on site into accommodation for further charity residents. The company acquired Preston-based skip hire firm, City Skips and its staff in 2013.

On 9 April 2015 Recycling Lives suffered a major fire overnight at its Longbridge Road scrap metal site at, which required 15 fire engines and 100 fire-fighters. The fire lasted from 21.40pm to 05.00am the following morning.

In late 2018, the private equity firm Three Hills Capital Partners invested more than £50 million for a 21 per cent stake in Recycling Lives.

In October 2020, founder Jackson stepped down as Chairman and chief executive William Fletcher also departed. Jackson Andrew Hodgson, formerly head of finance for manufacturing at BAE Systems Samlesbury, was appointed executive chairman.

== Recycling Lives UK charity ==
Recycling Lives’s commercial operations have provided financial support to the Recycling Lives UK social welfare charity via significant annual contributions. Registered as a charity in 2006, Recycling Lives UK (Reg. No. 1116562) did not begin trading immediately but became active in early 2008. It operates throughout England and Wales, Lancashire in particular, and received almost £500,000 in 2014 from its parent company.

The charity’s aim is to tackle poverty by reducing homelessness and unemployment in the community. Participants in the charity’s six-stage programme, known as residents, are provided with accommodation at a Recycling Lives Centre and offered training, education, financial support and work experience placements that enable them develop life and employability skills.

Residents who complete the full programme leave their accommodation at the Recycling Lives Centre when they are in full-time employment and able to live independently. They are provided with a range of floating support services by the Recycling Lives UK team and other local organisations. The charity is planning to expand its operations across Lancashire, and then nationwide. However, the charity still relies on public donations, such as for a minibus to enlarge the area in which it works.

== Community Dotcom schemes ==
Recycling Lives Limited operates a number of charity-led recycling and waste management services via online portals and regional collection partners. These services, known as Community Dotcoms, are available nationwide and include furniture donation, scrap car collection, skip hire, and bulky waste collection. Bookings are made on centralised online systems and sent to the most appropriate collection partner in the local area. The strategy for Community Dotcoms is to prioritise collection partners that are registered charities, offering them long-term support in becoming self-sufficient.

Revenues from Community Dotcom services are used to sustain UK charities, including Recycling Lives UK.

== Awards and press ==
Recycling Lives has won a number of local and national awards:

- 2010 Queen's Award for Enterprise (Sustainable Development)
- 2014 Queen's Award for Enterprise (Sustainable Development)
- 2010 LEP Lancashire Green Awards- Best Recycling Project
- 2010 BAE Systems Bronze Chairman's Award
- 2011 National Training Awards- Linda Ammon award winner
- 2011 ESF Sustainable Development Specialist Project Leader Award
