= The Intention Economy =

Book by Doc Searls

- First edition
- Author: Doc Searls
- Language: English
- Genre: non-fiction
- Publisher: Harvard Business Review Press
- Publication date: May 1, 2012
- Pages: 320
- ISBN: 978-1422158524

In April 2012, Doc Searls' book The Intention Economy: When Customers Take Charge was published. Searls coined the term intention economy in a March 2006 article for Linux Journal. He wrote: "The Intention Economy grows around buyers, not sellers. It leverages the simple fact that buyers are the first source of money, and that they come ready-made. You don't need advertising to make them."

The book forecasts changes to the economy as customers obtain more power through tools of their own, rather than just through allowances by sellers. Many of those tools have been fostered through Searls' work with ProjectVRM, at Harvard's Berkman Center for Internet and Society, where he served as a fellow from 2006–2010, and where the project continues under his direction.

VRM stands for Vendor relationship management, which is the customer-side counterpart of Customer Relationship Management, or CRM, a familiar business function and software category. The term "intention economy" was first coined by Searls in a 2006 article in Linux Journal, and has come into more general use since.
