= Too Big to Know =

2012 book by David Weinberger

- Author: David Weinberger
- Language: English
- Subject: Information theory, Internet
- Genre: Non-fiction
- Publisher: Basic Books
- Publication date: 2012
- Publication place: United States
- Pages: 256 pp.
- ISBN: 978-0465021420

Too Big to Know: Rethinking Knowledge Now That the Facts Aren't the Facts, Experts Are Everywhere, and the Smartest Person in the Room Is the Room is a non-fiction book by the American technology writer David Weinberger published in 2012 by Basic Books.

== Overview ==
It describes the World Wide Web-enabled shift in the production, transmission, reception, and storage of knowledge in the early 21st century. Weinberger discusses topics such as expertise, echo chambers, open government, the WELL, Debian, the U.S. Army's Center for the Advancement of Leader Development and Organizational Learning; and the writing of Charles Darwin (On the Origin of Species) and Nicholas G. Carr ("Is Google Making Us Stoopid?"). He argues that "networked knowledge brings us closer to the truth about knowledge."

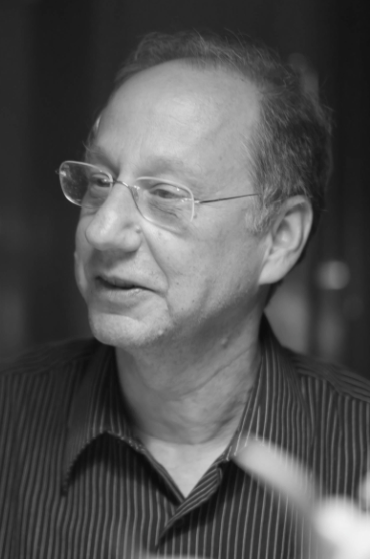
David Weinberger (2011)

== See also ==
- Knowledge ecosystem
