= Workspace =

Business and engineering term

Workspace is a term used in various branches of engineering and economic development.

== Business development ==
Workspace refers to small premises provided, often by local authorities or economic development agencies, to help new businesses to establish themselves. These typically provide not only physical space and utilities but also administrative services and links to support and finance organizations, as well as peer support among the tenants. A continuum of sophistication ranges through categories such as 'managed workspaces', 'business incubators' and 'business and employment co-operatives'. In cities, they are often set up in buildings that are disused but which the local authority wishes to retain as a landmark. At the larger end of the spectrum are business parks, virtual offices, technology parks and science parks.

The term was popularised in the UK in the 1970s by architects David Rock and John Townsend. In 1972, Rock Townsend opened Workspace, developing the idea of multidisciplinary working by providing office space for small design businesses; a former Sanderson wallpaper factory in Chiswick, west London was converted into the Barley Mow Centre, providing workspaces for craftspeople, designers and architects.

== Technology and software ==
In technology and software, "workspace" is a term used for several different purposes.

=== Software development ===
A workspace is (often) a file or directory that allows a user to gather various source code files and resources and work with them as a cohesive unit. Often these files and resources represent the complete state of an integrated development environment (IDE) at a given time, a snapshot. Workspaces are very helpful in cases of complex projects when maintenance can be challenging. Good examples of environments that allow users to create and use workspaces are Microsoft Visual Studio and Eclipse.

In configuration management, "workspace" takes on a different but related meaning; it is a part of the file system where the files of interest (for a given task like debugging, development, etc.) are located. It stores the user's view of the files stored in the configuration management's repository.

In either case, workspace acts as an environment where a programmer can work, isolated from the outside world, for the task duration.

=== Graphical interfaces ===
GNOME's workspace switcher.

Additionally, workspaces refer to the grouping of windows in some window managers. Grouping applications in this way is meant to reduce clutter and make the desktop easier to navigate.

Multiple workspaces are prevalent on Unix-like operating systems and certain operating system shells. Mac OS X 10.5 and later macOS releases include an equivalent feature called "Spaces". Windows 10 now offers a similar feature called 'Task View'. Windows XP PowerToy is available to bring this functionality to Windows XP.

Most systems with support for workspaces provide keyboard shortcuts to switch between them. Many also include some form of workspace switcher to change between them and sometimes to move windows between them as well.

Workspaces are visualized in different ways. For example, on Linux computers using Compiz or Beryl with the Cube and Rotate Cube plugins enabled, each workspace is rendered as a face of an on-screen cube, and switching between workspaces is visualized by zooming out from the current face, rotating the cube to the new face, and zooming back in. On macOS, the old set of windows slides off the screen and the new set slides on. Window managers without "eye candy" often simply remove the old windows and display the new ones without any sort of intermediate effect.

=== Computer-supported cooperative work ===
In the context of computer-supported cooperative work (CSCW) a shared workspace is a place of collaboration that enables group awareness. "A shared workspace provides a sense of place where collaboration takes place. It is generally associated with some part of the screen real estate of the user's computer where the user "goes" to work on shared artifacts, discovers work status, and interacts with his/her collaborators."

=== Online applications ===
In the context of software as a service, "workspace" is a term used by software vendors for applications that allow users to exchange and organize files over the Internet.

Such applications have several advantages over traditional FTP clients or virtual folder offerings, including:

- Ability to capture task performance data and version data
- Organization of information in a more user-friendly interface than a traditional file-based structure
- Secure storage and upload/download of data (many FTP clients are unsecured, susceptible to eavesdropping, or open to other abuse)
- Compatible with virtually all web browsers and computer operating systems.
- Updated on the server-side, meaning that a user will never have to update the software.

Beyond organizing and sharing files, these applications can often also be used as a business communication tool for assigning tasks, scheduling meetings, and maintaining contact information.

=== Robotics ===
In robotics, the workspace of a robot manipulator is often defined as the set of points that can be reached by its end-effector or, in other words, it is the space in which the robot works and it can be either a 3D space or a 2D surface.

== Mobile or unified workspace ==
A mobile or unified workspace allows enterprise IT to have a trusted space on any device where IT can deliver business applications and data.

Since the release of the iPad by Apple in 2009, bring your own device (BYOD) has become more common in the workplace. Previously, all computing devices used for work purposes were provisioned and managed by the IT department and not the employee. As the number of personal devices, and their usage in the workspace, increased it has changed the systems of work and created new challenges in how to deliver a consistent experience to all users.

Federica Troni and Mark Margevicius introduced the concept of Workspace Aggregator to solve the problem of BYOD. According to Gartner, a workspace aggregator unifies five capabilities: (1) Application Delivery: The ability to orchestrate provisioning and de-provisioning of mobile, PC and Web applications (2) Data: The secure delivery of corporate data (3) Management: Management of application life cycle, metering, and monitoring features (4) Security: Provision of context-aware security (5) User Experience: A superior user experience through the delivery of a unified workspace.
