= Intention economy =

The intention economy is an approach to viewing markets and economies focusing on buyers as a scarce commodity. Customers' intention to buy, drives the production of goods to meet their specific needs. It is also the title of Doc Searls book: The Intention Economy: When Customers Take Charge published in May 2012.

== Concept ==
Doc Searls coined the term in an article for Linux Journal. He wrote:
"The Intention Economy grows around buyers, not sellers. It leverages the simple fact that buyers are the first source of money, and that they come ready-made. You don't need advertising to make them."

Despite the advancement of the internet, businesses are still seller oriented. Even successful businesses like Google still have the point of view of the sellers, with their revenue coming nearly all from advertising. Searls describes the current condition as a series of silos. The only option a buyer has is merely moving from silo to silo. Nothing has fundamentally changed.

Some sites have similar characteristics of an intention economy. For example, flight booking services Priceline.com, which let users name their price for an airline ticket still functions like a "silo." In an intention economy a site like Priceline might serve as an intermediary with the airline coordinating new flight dates and times that correspond around the buyers intentions.

Companies need to be able to respond to a customer's precise needs. "Mass customization, in a lot of areas it is no longer inherently necessary that I get the exact same thing as a million other people. A computer manufacturer can be geared for assembling a computer just for me, to my specifications. A travel agency can construct a travel plan particularly for me."

== Examples ==
Searls gives an example of intention economy scenario: "A car rental customer should be able to say to the car rental market, 'I'll be skiing in Park City from March 20–25. I want to rent a 4-wheel drive SUV. I belong to Avis Wizard, Budget FastBreak and Hertz 1 Club. I don't want to pay up front for gas or get any insurance. What can any of you companies do for me?' — and have the sellers compete for the buyer's business."

Trendwatching.com describes two problems with intention economy sites. "...Most of these ‘information brokers’ focus on only one product/category. Many of them also work (too) closely with a limited set of suppliers. Sites that seem to act like intention economy sites are not. For example, Priceline which lets customers name their own price and then matches it with the (pre-set) minimum prices that airlines, hotels and rental car companies have provided Priceline.com with this space remains wide open for intention-brokers who can handle a variety of intentions per customer, and genuinely operate on behalf of those customers." Priceline ended its Name Your Own Price model for flights in 2016 and car rentals in 2018, and for hotels in 2020.

Trendwatching in 2007 listed examples of intention economy sites then online:

- Igglo lets potential buyers bid on houses that aren't on the market (unclear if still doing so in 2025)
- Zillow lets home owners name their "Make Me Move" before putting their house on the market.
- Eventful allowed users to collectively persuade performers to come to their town (no longer doing it in 2025)
- SellaBand allowed users to collectively sponsor and help manage a band for a cut of the revenue (last done in 2014)
- Kleemi allowed members to create list of intentions that friends and vendors can; comment, review, or make offers on (no evidence of a functioning website since 2011)
- Infinite Buyer allows registered consumers to make their offer on seller listings (abandoned in 2019)
- Intently.co allows users to request any service anywhere.

Current operational services:

- Angi (formerly Angie's List) - founded in 1995, Angi is a US-based online service that allows people to openly put out projects for bid to local contractors.

== Reactions ==
With the emergence of Artificial general intelligence and its increasing adoption in consumer information spaces, some have expressed more pessimism about the intention economy, suggesting that it: "will test democratic norms by subjecting users to clandestine modes of subverting, redirecting, and intervening on commodified signals of intent."

== See also ==
- Attention economy
