= Everything Is Miscellaneous =

2007 book by David Weinberger

Everything Is Miscellaneous: The Power of the New Digital Disorder
- Author: David Weinberger
- Language: English
- Publication place: United States
- ISBN: 0805080430

Everything Is Miscellaneous: The Power of the New Digital Disorder is a book by David Weinberger published in 2007 (ISBN 0805080430). The book's central premise is that there is no universally acceptable way of classifying information. Starting with the story of the Dewey Decimal Classification, Weinberger demonstrates that all attempts to classify inherently reflect the biases of the person defining the classification system.
