= Tasty Bits from the Technology Front =

Technology newsletter (1994–2002)

Tasty Bits from the Technology Front, abbreviated TBTF, was an e-mail and web-based technology newsletter written by Keith Dawson between 1994 and 2000. An associated weblog ran until 2002.

== Content ==
The newsletter included various regular features such as the Jargon Scout, edited by Dawson, which attempted to spot and catalog technology-related neologisms and, to some extent, invent them. Another popular feature was Siliconia, an early attempt (begun in 1995) to document the geographic locations that were attempting to brand themselves "Silicon <Something>" in order to ride the coattails of Silicon Valley. Dawson was interviewed about the Siliconia trend for stories in Wired magazine, the Washington Post, the New York Times, and many other outlets.

== Recognition ==
Dawson was named Internet Freedom's Internet Journalist of the Year in 1999, and TBTF was listed among Forbes.com's Best of the Web for the year 2000.

The Roving Reporter, aka Ted Byfield, covered the development of ICANN during its early days. Keith Dawson was a guest speaker at the First (and only) Annual Geek Pride Festival in Boston.
