= Basil Clarke =

English war correspondent

Sir Basil Clarke
- Born: Thomas Basil Clarke; 12 August 1879; Altrincham, England
- Died: 12 December 1947 (aged 68)

Sir Thomas Basil Clarke (12 August 1879 – 12 December 1947) was an English war correspondent during the First World War and is regarded as the UK's first public relations professional.

== Early life ==
Born in Altrincham, the son of a chemist, Clarke went to Manchester Grammar School and then as a young man, he played for Manchester Rugby Club, despite the handicap of having only one eye, the result of an accident in infancy.

Originally, he intended to make a music career. and he started a long-distance degree in Classics and Music at Oxford University but dropped out without completing any exams. After a career in banking, he spent most of 1903 travelling Germany, where he taught English, boxing and swimming and played the piano in an orchestra.

== Journalism ==
His entry into journalism apparently came after a chance encounter in a hotel, where he joined in with some strangers as the fourth voice in a Gilbert & Sullivan quartet and was invited to write an article on musical appreciation for the Evening Gazette in Manchester. He then worked for six months as a "volunteer sub-editor" for the Manchester Courier before joining the Manchester Guardian as a sub-editor.

He worked as a sub-editor between 1904 and 1907 before its editor, C.P. Scott, appointed him as a reporter in 1907. While he covered general news, he specialised in aviation and was an eyewitness to the death of Charles Rolls, the Rolls-Royce founder who was the first Briton to die in an air crash. It was his articles on aviation that drew him to the attention of Lord Northcliffe and in 1910 he was persuaded to join the Daily Mail. There, he was still based in Manchester and covered stories such as the Hawes Junction rail disaster and played a role in the Daily Mail's campaign for improving the nutritional content of bread. Then in 1914 he was sent on his first foreign assignment, travelling to Canada undercover as a migrant worker to find out the life that awaited the hundreds of thousands of people then emigrating to Canada.

== First World War ==
At the outbreak of war, he was called down to London to represent the Daily Mail at the Press Bureau in London. In October 1914 he was ordered to try to get to Ostend before it was taken by the German Army. When he discovered that he was too late, he traveled to Europe anyway and managed to get to Dunkirk, where he stayed three months. He lived there as a fugitive because of a ban on war reporters at the front during the early part of the war and was the first reporter to get into Ypres following the German destruction of it in November 1914.

He was forced to return to England in January 1915, the Daily Mail sent him on a tour of neutral countries to try to uncover their intentions. His time in Greece, Bulgaria and Romania did not yield any very useful information, though while there he did send back some vivid reports of fighting between the Austrian and Russian forces and on one occasion had to escape from Chernivtsi in the middle of the night when he woke to find it had been taken by Russian forces as he had slept.

He returned home to spend the rest of 1915 reporting on the impact of the war at home, including an article about the role of women in munitions factories, before causing a global scandal in January 1916 by accusing the Government of failing to enforce the blockade of Germany. His criticism of the Government, which was covered by newspapers around the world, is seen by some as one of the reasons for the establishment of a Ministry of Blockade in February 1916.

He then reported on the Easter Rising - he was the first English journalist to get independent reports out of Dublin - before leaving the Daily Mail after an argument with its news editor, Walter G Fish. He spent the last few months of 1916 as an accredited reporter at the Battle of the Somme, before publishing a memoir of his war experiences, which he called My Round of the War, at the start of 1918.

== Public relations ==
At the end of 1917, he became director of special intelligence at the Ministry of Reconstruction after being recruited on behalf of Christopher Addison, who had an interest in propaganda. When Addison left to become president of the Local Government Board, Clarke followed him in 1919 and then joined the Ministry of Health when it was founded, with Addison as the Minister of Health, in 1919. After two months he left to become editor of the Sheffield Independent before rejoining the Ministry of Health six months later, in March 1920. he was then seconded to Dublin Castle in August 1920 to lead the British propaganda (Official known as the Department of Publicity/Public Information) effort during the Irish War of Independence.

His time in Dublin was controversial. The official newspaper of the government of the Irish Republic, the Irish Bulletin, accused Clarke of inventing stories and more recently historians have accused him of putting out false information to discredit Sinn Féin and the IRA. But a 2013 biography of Clarke has suggested that while some of the statements issued by his office were incorrect, there is no strong evidence this was done deliberately. Clarke worked to counter the negative press coverage associated with two high profile deaths in Ireland: the death on hunger strike by the Lord Mayor of Cork Terence MacSwiney (25 October 1920) and the execution of 18 year old Kevin Barry (1 November 1920). By mid-November 1920, the Irish Bulletin was publishing information which showed that Clarkes "official" narrative of Irish affairs was highly suspect. Clarkes Department of Publicity/Public Information had the difficult task of writing the British response to the Bloody Sunday retaliatory massacre in November 1920.

Also in Ireland, Clarke pioneered an approach to public relations he called "propaganda by news", the practice of influencing the news agenda through the selection of which news to release. The theory of propaganda by news is that it is facts that will influence public opinion and so these should be presented in as plain language as possible, rather than trying to add negative adjectives to it.

Following the Irish War of Independence, Clarke returned to the Ministry of Health and while there was knighted in 1923 for his services in Ireland. But the same year he was made redundant as part of the Geddes Axe. In 1924 he established Editorial Services Ltd, now generally seen as the first UK public relations agency, and by the end of the 1920s he was running a significant operation with 60 staffers. Its clients included Heinz, Lyons and the National Union of Teachers. While running Editorial Services Ltd, he developed the world's first public relations code of conduct and he championed ethics in public relations.

== Personal life ==
Clarke married Alice in 1904 and they had seven children together. He was a member of various clubs and societies, including President of the Manchester Press Club and he was awarded the Order of the Dannebrog for his membership of the Anglo-Danish Society. He also had various business investments, including Whitehall Films, but these investments were invariably failures.

While well-liked, he displayed a violent temper throughout his adult life. His job teaching English in Germany in 1903 ended following a fight with his employer, while in 1930 he was involved in two high-profile court cases after violent incidents. In one of them he was accused of attacking a former colleague at Whitehall Films with an oar while he was out boating on the River Thames with his wife.

== Retirement and death ==
Clarke had a stroke in 1935 and spent the rest of his life in ill-health. He died in 1947.

== Bibliography ==
- The Army's Monster Mail by Basil Clarke. Originally published in ‘the War Illustrated’ 1 September 1917
- My round of the war Basil Clarke, published by W. Heinemann, 1917
- From the Frontline: The Extraordinary Life of Sir Basil Clarke, Richard Evans, published by The History Press, 2013

== See also ==
- History of public relations

== Sources ==
- Murphy, Brian P., The Origins and Organisation of British Propaganda In Ireland – 1920, Aubane Historical Society and SpinWatch (2006)
- Evans, Richard, From the Frontline: The Extraordinary Life of Sir Basil Clarke, The History Press (2013)
