= Kantara Initiative =

Digital identity organization

- Founded: 2009
- Type: Information Technology and Services – Industry consortium and professional trade organization
- Purpose: Trust framework conformity assessment, assurance and Trust Mark operations for digital identity management and personal data privacy
- Origins: Founded by private sector identity management industry vendors, later joined by government agencies and individual subject matter experts
- Method: Programs, Recommendations, Conferences, Publications
- Key people: Kay Chopard (Executive Director); Lynzie Adams (Executive Programs Manager); Andrew Hughes (Chair of the Leadership Council)
- Website: kantarainitiative.org

Kantara Initiative, Inc. is a non-profit trade association that works to develop standards for identity and personal data management. It focuses on improving the trustworthy use of identity and personal data in digital identity management and data privacy.

Kantara translates to "wooden bridge" in Kiswahili, which is the inspiration for the bridge of Kantara’s logo. The name is attributed to Nat Sakimura, a Kantara founding board director and Open ID Foundation chair, who spent his childhood in Africa.

Kantara drafts technical specifications and recommendations for industry use and submits them to standards development organizations, such as Organization for the Advancement of Structured Information Standards (OASIS), Worldwide Web Consortium (W3C), Internet Engineering Task Force (IETF) and SC27 (Security Techniques) Working Group 5 (Identity Management and Privacy) of the International Organization for Standardization (ISO).

Kantara provides input to policy bodies such as OECD as well as some inter-government initiatives related to identity management and personal data agency.

== Projects ==
- The Kantara Assurance Framework facilitates the 3rd party assessment and assurance of providers' services seeking conformance to NIST 800-63-3 at IAL 2 and AAL2, which was expected to extend to FAL2 later in 2019.
- The Kantara Consent Receipt specification v1.1 underwent a minor revision, and simultaneously a more generic broader-based information-sharing framework (from which the Consent Receipt was partly derived) was s being developed in response to community feedback interested in standardizing an expanding suite of profiles. An example of the Consent Receipt is referenced in the standard ISO/IEC 29184 Online privacy notices and Consent. According to the initiative's executive director, the idea behind the consent receipt is for individuals and companies to both be able to maintain and manage permissions for personal data.
- The Kantara User-Managed Access (UMA) specification—a set of standardized extensions to OAuth 2.0 aimed at asynchronous user permissioning and delegated authorization—has stabilized at V2.0 with the early adopter implementers now standardizing profiles and extensions. A Business and Legal framework is being developed to complement the technical protocol framework already completed. UMA received the Best Innovation Security Award from the European Identity & Cloud Conference 2014.

Of completed projects, the following are noteworthy:

- Kantara completed the project of incubating the IDPro project in 2017. IDPro is now a 501(c)6 industry association for digital identity professionals. Kantara will continue to develop the Body of Knowledge for the good of IDPro and the community. This effort was kicked off in 2016 with an electronic pledge where digital identity professionals signify their support for a digital identity professional association and Kantara’s principles.
- Kantara has all but completed the Applied R&D project with Rutgers University’s Command, Control, and Interoperability Center for Advanced Data Analysis (CCICADA), a US Department of Homeland Security University Center of Excellence, a main component of the KIPI (Kantara Identity and Privacy Incubator) program. Two projects to progress through all three phases to transition to commercialization are Mobile Device Attribute Verification (MDAV) and NFC4PACS. Kantara's R&D grant funding currently centres around NGI_Trust (a project under the European Commission's H2020 program) where Kantara Europe is a consortium partner. Kantara's publishes the outputs from its workgroups on its website where they are free to download.

== History ==
The initiative was established in 2009 by a group of identity management (IDM) technical interoperability organizations using a bi-cameral system of governance. Responding to industry consortia fragmentation, Kantara aimed to form a unified, transparent and inclusive member organization for digital identity community stakeholders.

In 2011, Kantara focused on serving the needs of relying parties. Kantara did so by developing assessment, assurance, and trust marks for federated trust frameworks, as well as developing urgently needed specifications quicker than the lengthy processes undertaken by Standards Development Organizations (SDOs). Private and public sector relying party organizations (initially from the United States, but globally as of 2024) joined the initiative to develop identity and credential requirements and operate conformance and assurance programs, thus complementing the missions and outputs of other industry consortia, such as PDEC (Personal Data Ecosystem Consortium), Customer Commons the CARIN Alliance, Identity Commons, FIDO Alliance and IDESG (assets transitioned to Kantara Educational Foundation in June 2018).

Formerly an affiliate program under IEEE-ISTO, Kantara Initiative self-incorporated as a 501(c)6 nonprofit organization in January 2016. In 2018, two financially separate but similarly missioned and branded organizations were established—Mittetulundusuhing Kantara Initiative Europe, an Estonian based Trade Association, and Kantara Initiative Educational Foundation Inc, a US incorporated 501(c)3 in the US.
