= Shift Communications =

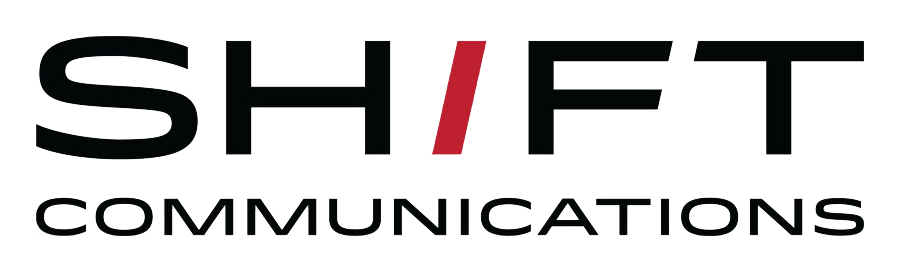
- Predecessor: Sterling Hager
- Founded: April 13, 2003
- Founder: Jim Joyal, Todd Defren and Ed Weiler
- Headquarters: Boston, Massachusetts, United States
- Number of locations: 3
- Key people: Todd Defren, principal Jim Joyal, principal
- Services: Marketing
- Revenue: $12 million (2012)
- Number of employees: 91
- Website: shiftcomm.com

Shift Communications is a public relations and marketing firm based in Boston with offices in New York and San Francisco. The company was founded in 2003, when the clients and assets of former public relations firm Sterling Hager was acquired by three of its top executives. In 2006, it created the first world's first Social Media Release. The firm's primary practice areas are in the healthcare, technology and consumer markets.

== History ==
Shift Communications was founded in May 2003 out of a technology PR firm, Sterling Hager. Sterling Hager sold the firm's assets to three of his executives, Jim Joyal, Todd Defren and Ed Weiler, who renamed and re-launched the firm as Shift Communications. In 2005, the firm developed cutting-edge and market leading lead-tracking software called LeadSensor, which was licensed to Vernier Networks.

In 2006, Shift created the industry's first Social Media Release a few days after a blog was published by former Financial Times journalist Tom Foremski titled "Die! Press release! Die! Die! Die!". The template Shift created for a modern press release was based on the feedback Foremski published in his blog post, which is now cited in college courses on public relations.

In 2016, Shift Communications was acquired by National Public Relations, a Canadian-based public relations firm.

== Services and operations ==
Shift Communications provides public relations, content marketing, web development, email marketing and social media marketing services among many other services. Its primary practice areas are for the consumer, technology and healthcare sectors. It refers business for marketing communications in Europe and Asia to its affiliate, The Hoffman Agency. The company is owned by its employees in an Employee Stock Ownership Plan (ESOP). Ownership of the company passed to its staff in 2012.

== Notable clients and campaigns ==
Shift Communications started serving technology clients it inherited from its predecessor, Sterling Hager. During its first year as Shift Communications it organized the Woman's Heart Day Health Fair for the non-profit Sister to Sister: Everyone has a Heart Foundation, in an unusual partnership with its competitor, The Castle Group. It helped the RSA Conference promote new events in 2005 and helped the cycling components manufacturer, Shimano, promote bicycling.

Shift became the agency of record for the travel club, Club Med, in 2009 and helped sleep monitoring device manufacturer, Zeo, promote "sleep wellness". It started supporting a documents, packaging and mail services provider Pitney Bowes the following year. It became the agency of record for Sony's gaming division in 2010, for The McDonald's Advertising Cooperative and AOL in 2011 and was recruited to support content marketing for H&R Block in 2012. It also started doing work for Toyota in 2013.
