= CALDOL =

Organization formed by the U.S. Army

CALDOL (Center for the Advancement of Leader Development and Organizational Learning) was created by the U.S. Army in 2002 at West Point to improve the development of leadership by using Internet tools to increase communication and collaborative learning among officers.

CALDOL operated a set of online professional development sites and services known collectively as Milspace, connecting Army officers with peers and more experienced officers. The legacy Milspace presence had discussion forums, blogging spaces, downloadable reading materials, video interviews, and some features of social networking. In addition, CALDOL conducted research into knowledge management and leadership development.

CALDOL grew out of the CompanyCommand.org project begun in 2000 as a place where unit commanders could share their experiences and ask questions of one another. In 2002, the Army established CALDOL, putting it under the direction of the team of West Point graduates and instructors who had created CompanyCommand.

The organization has innovated over time - adjusting the value it provides to the Army. It was rebranded in 2020. It is now known as The Center for Junior Officers.
