= Doc Searls =

American journalist, author, and blogger

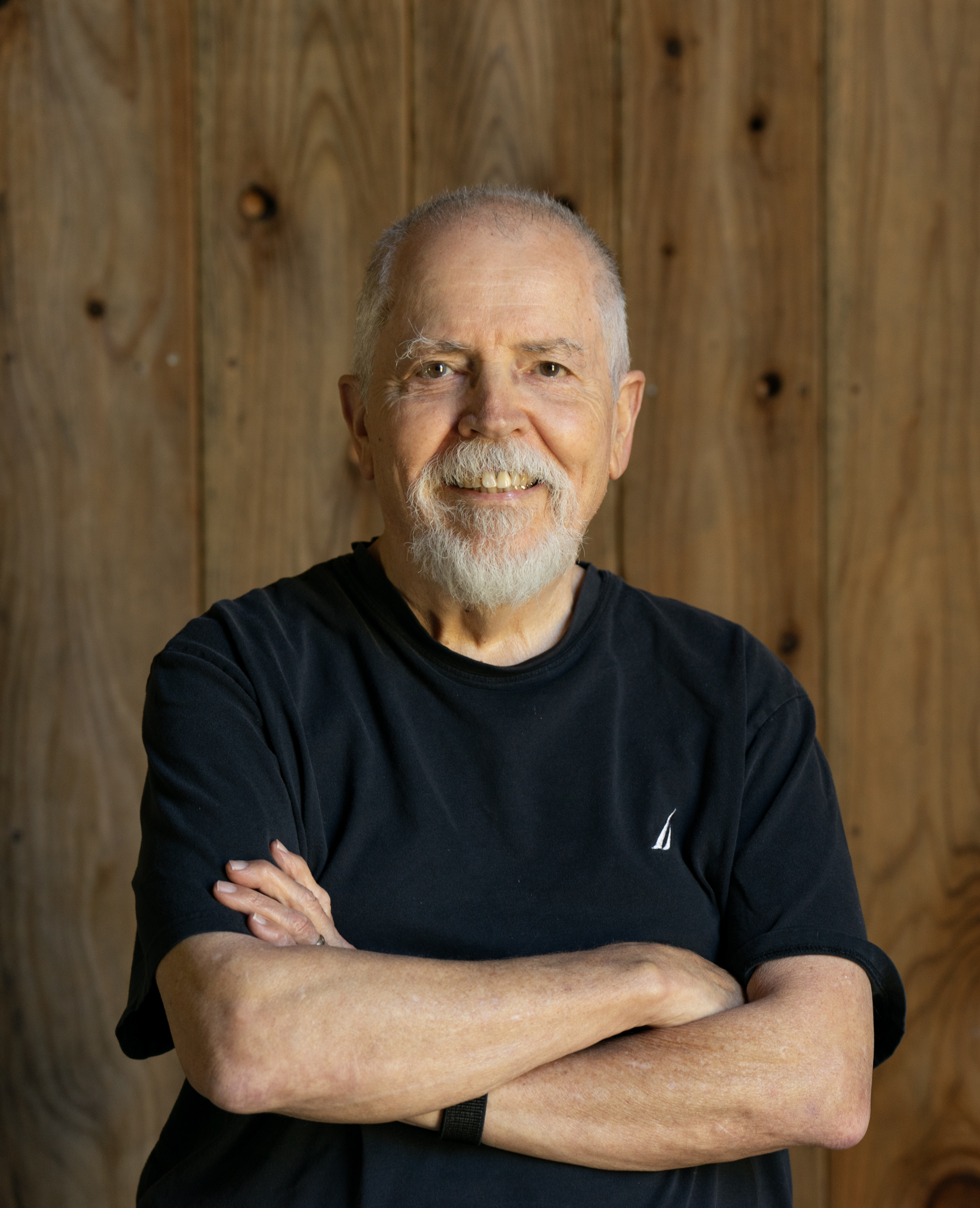
- Born: July 29, 1947 (age 78); Jersey City, New Jersey, U.S.
- Occupations: Journalist; author; blogger; podcaster; photographer
- Spouse: Joyce Searls
- Website: searls.com

David "Doc" Searls (born July 29, 1947) is an American journalist, author, and blogger. A longtime advocate for free and open-source software, he served as an editor of Linux Journal for twenty-five years, including as editor-in-chief, and received the Google-O'Reilly Open Source Award for Best Communicator in 2005. He is a co-author of The Cluetrain Manifesto (2000) and author of The Intention Economy: When Customers Take Charge (2012). He founded ProjectVRM at the Berkman Klein Center for Internet & Society at Harvard University, and co-founded the Internet Identity Workshop, a twice-yearly conference on digital identity.

== Early life and career ==
Searls is a 1969 graduate of Guilford College. His journalism career began in 1971, when he worked as an editor and photographer for Wayne Today in New Jersey.

The nickname "Doc" is what Searls calls a "fossil remnant" of "Doctor Dave", his humorous persona at WDBS (now WXDU) radio at Duke University in Durham, North Carolina, in the late 1970s. Following his work in radio, Searls co-founded Hodskins Simone & Searls (HS&S), serving as its Creative Director. The agency grew to become one of Silicon Valley's leading technology advertising and marketing agencies before being acquired by Publicis Technology in 1998. The Searls Group, a consultancy he operates with his wife Joyce, was spun out of HS&S in the early 1990s.

== Open source advocacy ==
A longtime advocate for open-source software, he has been involved with the Linux Journal since it began publishing in 1994. He became a contributing editor in 1996, senior editor in 1999, and editor-in-chief in 2018. His column "Linux for Suits" ran until 2007, and was followed by "EOF" inside each issue's back cover.

His work with Linux Journal, and as an advocate of free software and open-source, earned him the Google-O'Reilly Open Source Award for Best Communicator in 2005, with the award citation describing him as an "Internet pioneer." His byline has also appeared in many other publications, including The Wall Street Journal, Harvard Business Review, OMNI, Wired, PC Magazine, The Standard, The Sun Magazine, Upside, Release 1.0 and The Globe and Mail.

Searls was a regular participant on the Gillmor Gang, an early and influential technology podcast hosted by Steve Gillmor and produced by IT Conversations, alongside regulars including Jon Udell, Dan Farber, and Mike Arrington. From 2020 until the show ended in December 2023, he hosted FLOSS Weekly, a podcast on free and open-source software produced by the TWiT Network. He is co-host of the Reality 2.0 podcast.

== The Cluetrain Manifesto ==
In early 1999 Searls joined Christopher Locke, David Weinberger and Rick Levine in writing The Cluetrain Manifesto, an iconoclastic website whose title derived from an anonymous executive's description of a company that had failed to adapt: "The clue train stopped there four times a day for ten years and they never took delivery."

The website was followed in January 2000 by the book with the same title, published in nine languages. A 10th Anniversary edition came out in June 2009, and in 2015 Searls and Weinberger co-authored "New Clues," an updated companion document.

Among Searls' contributions to the Manifesto was its opening thesis — "Markets are conversations" — which he and Weinberger also developed into a full chapter of the book. Weinberger and Searls also co-wrote "World of Ends: What the Internet Is and How to Stop Mistaking It for Something Else."

In The World Is Flat, Thomas L. Friedman described Searls as "one of the most respected technology writers in America."

== Blogging ==
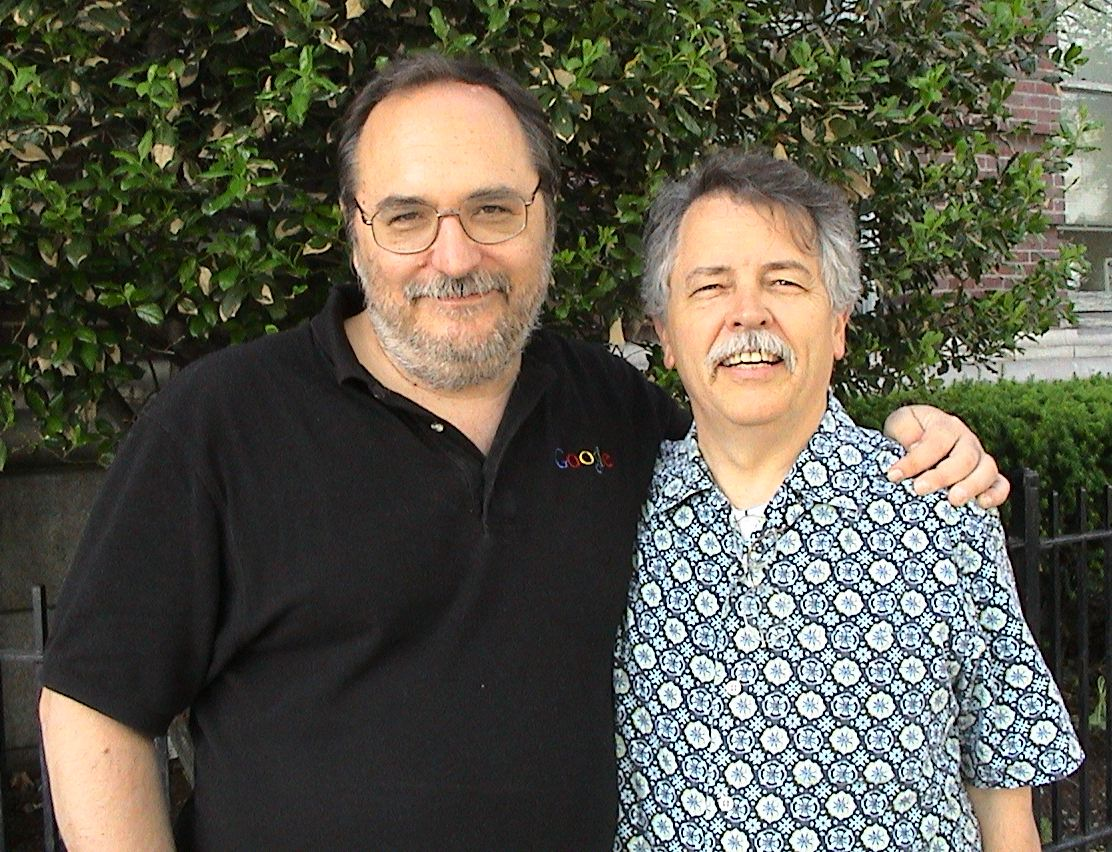
Doc Searls (right) with Dave Winer at the ClickZ Weblog Business Strategies Conference, June 2003

Searls has been a blogger since October 1999, when he started with help from his friend Dave Winer, a pioneer of blogging tools and the RSS syndication format. The two were close collaborators in the early blogging community, with Searls a frequent guest on Winer's podcast Morning Coffee Notes and a co-presenter with Winer at industry conferences.

Searls was credited with coining the term "blogrolling" — the practice of bloggers linking to each other's sites in a sidebar list — in a December 2000 post. In an Online Journalism Review article, J.D. Lasica described Searls as "one of the deep thinkers in the blog movement."

== Vendor relationship management ==
Beginning in 2006, Searls held fellowships at two institutions. At the Berkman Klein Center for Internet & Society at Harvard University (2006–2010), he founded ProjectVRM, an initiative promoting Vendor Relationship Management (VRM) — tools intended to give individuals greater independence from vendor lock-in and better means of engaging with businesses on their own terms. At the Center for Information Technology and Society (CITS) at the University of California, Santa Barbara, where he has been a fellow since 2006, his focus has been on understanding the Internet as a form of infrastructure.

In April 2012, his book The Intention Economy: When Customers Take Charge was published by Harvard Business Review Press. Searls coined the term in an article for Linux Journal in March 2006.

Customer Commons, a nonprofit spun out of ProjectVRM, continues to develop open standards in this space, including the IEEE P7012 (MyTerms) standard.

In September 2018, Searls spoke at TEDx Santa Barbara on the impact of surveillance-based advertising on journalism and public trust.

== Digital identity ==
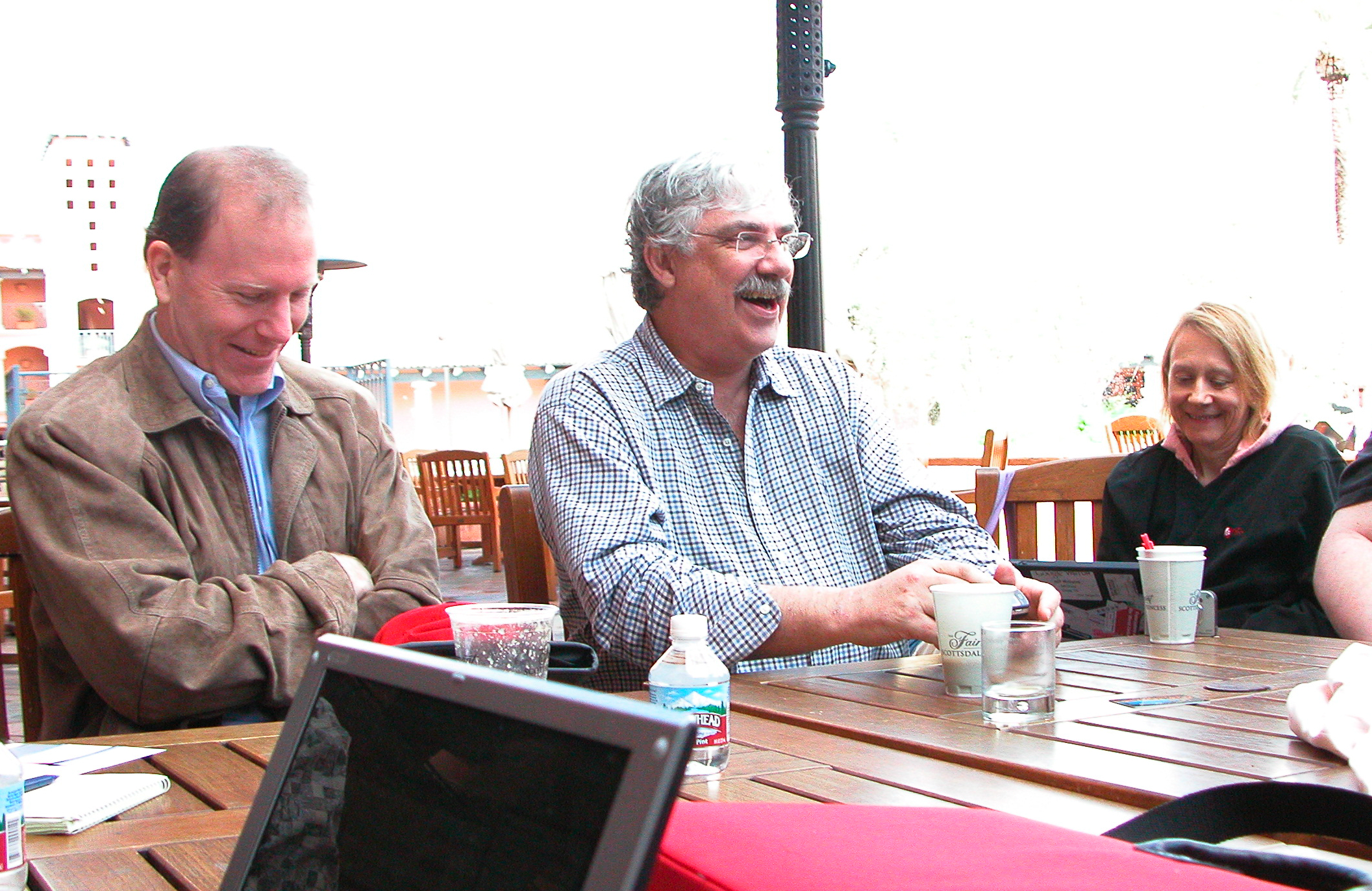
Drummond Reed, Kim Cameron and Esther Dyson at the first "Identity Gang" gathering

A special episode of the Gillmor Gang recorded on December 31, 2004 is credited by Searls with bringing together what became known as the "Identity Gang," a group whose subsequent in-person meeting led directly to the founding of the Internet Identity Workshop (IIW). Co-founded with Phil Windley and Kaliya Young in 2005, IIW is an unconference focused on digital identity that has met twice yearly since its founding, and at the Computer History Museum in Mountain View, California since 2006. Over the years, IIW participants have been instrumental in developing widely used internet protocols including OAuth, OpenID Connect, and passkeys.

== Photography ==
Searls is a prolific photographer who releases his work under Creative Commons licenses. His ice crystal photographs, shot on a freezing morning at his apartment near Boston, were discovered by NBC on Flickr and used as backdrop screens during their coverage of the 2010 Winter Olympics in Vancouver — an outcome Searls described as "a big win for Creative Commons." More than 1,600 of his photographs have been uploaded to Wikimedia Commons, where they accompany articles across Wikipedia.

== Personal life ==
Searls and his wife Joyce live in Bloomington, Indiana, where both are visiting scholars at the Ostrom Workshop at Indiana University.
