= Mobile workspace =

A mobile workspace is a user's portable working environment that gives them access to the applications, files and services they need to do their job no matter where they are.

Mobile workspace technology describes a set of software and services that deliver corporate apps, files and services to a user on any device and over any network. This technology was designed for business users that require access to all of their content on both corporate and personally-owned devices, including PCs, smartphones and tablets. Mobile workspace technologies are formed by bringing together a set of software and services including desktop virtualization, application virtualization, enterprise mobility management, file sharing, virtual private networks and more (see the full list below).

== Business Need ==
According to recent research, combined shipments of devices including PCs, tablets, ultramobiles and mobile phones are projected to reach 2.5 billion units in 2014, a 7.6 percent increase from 2013. This trend, which is expected to continue to grow, is being driven by users who utilize more than one device. In fact, today the average user has 3+ different devices that they use for work purposes on a daily basis. These mobile devices entering the enterprise has led to over 60% of information workers working outside of a traditional office. While the shift to mobility seems to be growing, it is causing problems for both the end user and IT department. End users don't feel they are equipped to work outside of the office and IT is forced to manage the security risks presented by data and applications leaving the corporate network.

To address these challenges, organizations are looking to mobile workspace technology that can provide users access to their corporate applications, files and services while maintaining security for their IT department. Mark Bowker, senior analyst, Enterprise Strategy Group said, "Mobile workspaces are playing a key role in addressing the new organizational imperative around secure mobility".

== Components ==
Applications Microsoft (particularly Microsoft Office) have been the dominant office software suite for enterprise along with numerous other Windows applications. Newer to the market is the growth of Software-as-a-Service and web-based applications such as Salesforce.com, LinkedIn and Evernote. Additionally, mobile applications have seen growth of 200% from 2011 to 2012, a trend that is expected to continue into 2013. A mobile workspace includes access to all types of applications (Windows, mobile, web, SaaS, and HTML5-based) from the user device.

Data Files access is important for business productivity as well as business collaboration. A user's mobile workspace must give a user access to all of their corporate data and allow for this data to be accessible on multiple devices. This requirement for file sync and sharing has led to the growth of many online sharing options including Citrix Sharefile, Dropbox, Google Drive, Box, and iCloud.

Collaboration Due to factors like globalization, telecommuting and employees working outside of traditional offices, collaboration tools are becoming increasingly important. Collaboration tools include electronic communication, online web-conferencing, file sharing and social collaboration software.

Network access People now work from all locations – the office, a coffee shop, the airport, their homes – yet still require access to their content. When outside the office, people still need access to resources behind the firewall generally requiring VPN access. A mobile workspace allows secure access to apps, data and services no matter where the user is or what type of network they are using (LAN, WAN, 3G/4G, etc.).

Cloud As cloud computing becomes more popular, IT organizations are looking to the cloud to host more services. IT departments now can choose where to host their apps, data, desktops, etc. in the most appropriate location, whether that's on-premises in a datacenter, or in a private, public or hybrid cloud. Users need access to these resources from their mobile workspace.

Any device Research suggests that mobile devices are set to outnumber the total number people on earth by 2014. As device types and manufacturers continue to grow, users still need to access their mobile workspace irrespective of device type, operating system or manufacturer.

== Technologies that make up a mobile workspace ==
- Desktop virtualization
- Application virtualization
- Mobile device management
- Mobile application management
- Enterprise mobility management
- File sync and share
- Remote desktop software
- WAN optimization
- Collaboration software
