= David Weinberger =

American philosopher (born 1950)

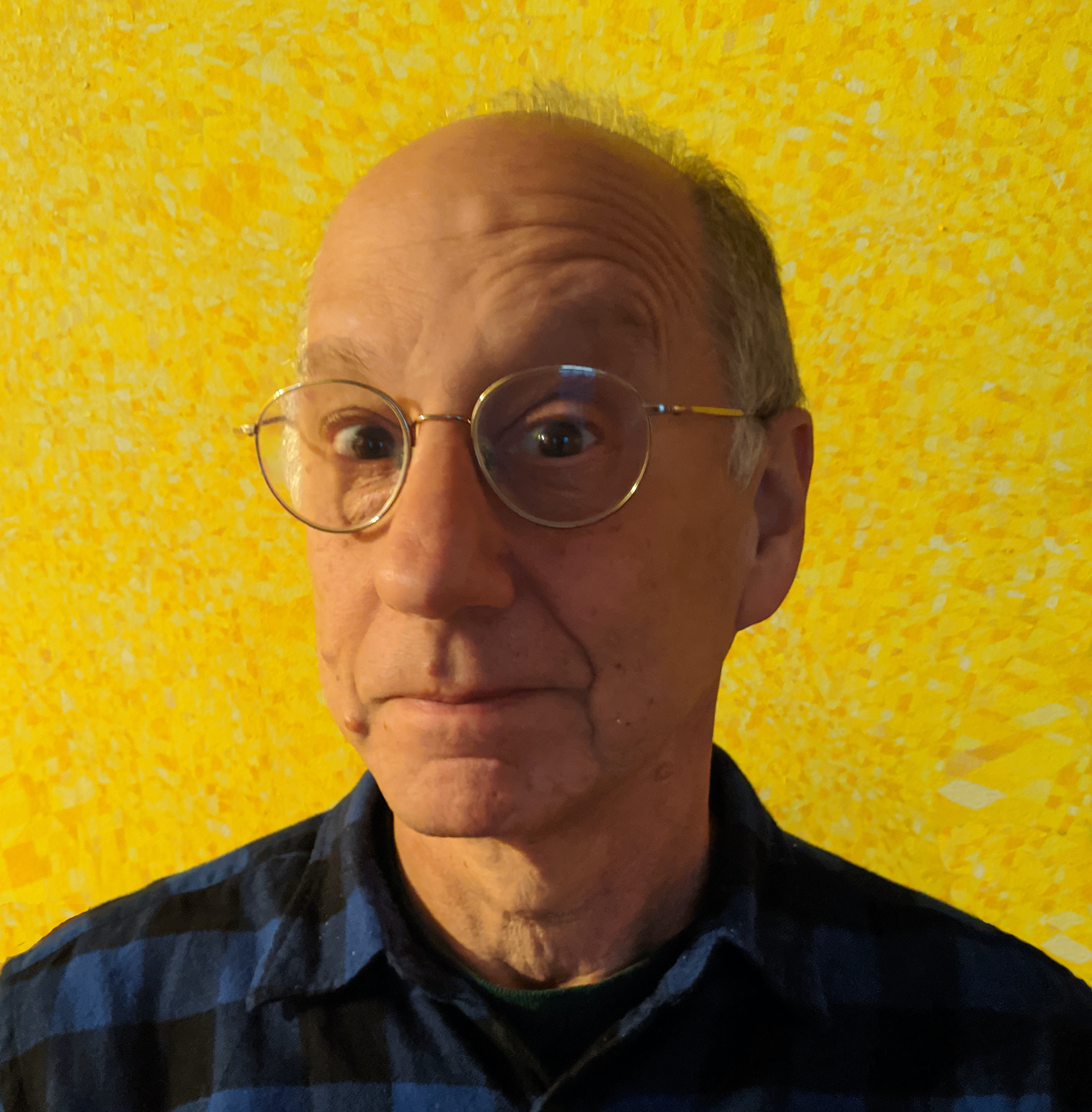
- David Weinberger
- Born: 1950 (age 75–76); New York City, U.S.
- Education: University of Toronto (PhD)
- Occupations: technologist, pundit

David Weinberger (born 1950) is an American author, technologist, and speaker. Trained as a philosopher, Weinberger's work focuses on how technology — particularly the internet and machine learning — is changing our ideas, with books about the effect of machine learning’s complex models on business strategy and sense of meaning; order and organization in the digital age; the networking of knowledge; the Net's effect on core concepts of self and place; and the shifts in relationships between businesses and their markets.

== Career ==
Weinberger holds a Ph.D. from the University of Toronto and taught college from 1980-1986 primarily at Stockton University (then known as Stockton State College). From 1986 until the early 2000s he wrote about technology, and became a marketing consultant and executive at several high-tech companies, including Interleaf and Open Text. His best-known book is 2000’s Cluetrain Manifesto (co-authored), a work noted for its early awareness of the Net as social medium. From 1997 through 2003 he was a frequent commentator on National Public Radio's All Things Considered, with about three dozen contributions. In addition, he was a gag writer for the comic strip "Inside Woody Allen" from 1976 to 1983.

In 2002, Weinberger published Small Pieces Loosely Joined: A Unified Theory of the Web (ISBN 0-7382-0543-5), where he argued that the World Wide Web has significantly altered humanity's understanding or perception of the concepts of space, matter, time, perfection, public, knowledge, and morality.

In 2004 he became a Fellow at Harvard’s Berkman Klein Center for Internet & Society and as of 2023 serves as an affiliation of the center. In 2008 he served as a visiting lecturer at Harvard Law School and co-taught a course on "The Web Difference" with John Palfrey. From 2010 to 2014 he was Co-Director of the Harvard Library Innovation Lab. In 2015, he was a fellow at the Shorenstein Center on Media, Politics and Public Policy at Harvard’s Kennedy School of Government. He is an advisor to Harvard’s MetaLAB metaLAB, and the Harvard Business School Digital Initiative, and other non-commercial and commercial organizations. He continues to teach courses at Harvard Extension School on the effect of technology on ideas.

Beginning in 2015, Weinberger turned much of his attention to the philosophical and ethical implications of machine learning, resulting in a series of articles, talks and workshops, and his 2019 book Everyday Chaos. From June 2018 to June 2020, he was embedded in Google’s People + AI Research (PAIR), a machine learning research group located in Cambridge, Massachusetts, as a part-time writer-in-residence.

Weinberger has been involved in Internet policy and advocacy. He had the title Senior Internet Advisor to Howard Dean's 2004 presidential campaign, and was on technology policy advisory councils for both of Barack Obama’s presidential campaigns and Hillary Clinton’s 2016 campaign. From 2010-12 he was a Franklin Fellow at the U.S. Department of State, working with the e-Diplomacy Group. He has written and spoken frequently in favor of policies that favor a more open Internet, including in Salon, NPR, We Are the Internet and in a series of video interviews with the Federal Communications Commission.

== Honors ==
- In 2007, The Massachusetts Technology Leadership Council named him Mover & Shaker of the Year
- 2012, Too Big to Know won both the World Technology Award as best technology book of the year and the GetAbstract International Book Award
- In 2014, Simmons College made him an honorary Doctor of Letters.
- Axiom named ``Everyday Chaos`` the "Best Business Commentary of 2019", and Inc. magazine listed it as one of 2019's "11 Must-Read Books for Entrepreneurs"

== Books ==
- The Cluetrain Manifesto, 2000
- Small Pieces Loosely Joined: A Unified Theory of the Web, 2002
- Everything is Miscellaneous: The Power of the New Digital Disorder, 2007
- Too Big to Know: Rethinking Knowledge Now That the Facts Aren't the Facts, Experts Are Everywhere, and the Smartest Person in the Room Is the Room, 2012
- Everyday Chaos: Technology, Complexity, and How We’re Thriving in a New World of Possibility, 2019
- Beautiful Particulars: How AI’s Attention to the Smallest of Differences Is Reshaping Our Biggest Ideas, 2026

== Other works ==
- How Machine Learning Pushes Us to Define Fairness: Harvard Business Review, Nov. 2019.
- Weinberger, David (April 18, 2017). "Our Machines Now Have Knowledge We'll Never Understand". Wired.
- Optimization over Explanation Berkman Klein, Jan. 28, 2018
- New Clues (with Doc Searls)
- Library as Platform, Library Journal, Sept. 4,2012
- Shift Happens, "The Chronicle of Higher Education," April 22, 2012
- "The Machine That Would Predict the Future", Scientific American, Dec. 2011
- World of Ends, What the Internet Is and How to Stop Mistaking It for Something Else (with Doc Searls)
- Transparency is the New Objectivity, Joho the Blog, July 19, 2009
- “To Know but Not Understand,” The Atlantic, Jan. 3, 2012
- "The Internet that was (and still could be)", The Atlantic, June 22, 2015.
