= The Cluetrain Manifesto =

Work of business literature

- Paperback edition
- Author: Rick Levine, Christopher Locke, Doc Searls, and David Weinberger
- Language: English
- Genre: Non-fiction
- Publisher: Basic Books
- Publication date: June 30, 2009
- Publication place: America
- Media type: Print: Paperback
- Pages: 320 pp.
- ISBN: 978-0465024094

The Cluetrain Manifesto is a work of business literature collaboratively authored by Rick Levine, Christopher Locke, Doc Searls, and David Weinberger. It was first posted to the web in 1999 as a set of ninety-five theses, and was published as a book in 2000 with the theses extended by seven essays. The work examines the impact of the Internet on marketing, claiming that conventional marketing techniques are rendered obsolete by the online "conversations" that consumers have and that companies need to join.

== Overview ==
The Cluetrain Manifesto was written and first posted to the Web in March 1999 by Rick Levine, Christopher Locke, Doc Searls, and David Weinberger. A revised and extended version of the text appeared as a book under the title The Cluetrain Manifesto: The End of Business as Usual in 2000.

In its central thesis that "markets are conversations", the work asserts that the Internet is unlike conventional media used in mass marketing as it enables conversations amongst consumers and between consumers and companies, which are claimed to transform traditional business practices. Technologies listed in the printed publication as conduits of such conversations include email, news groups, mailing lists, chat, and web pages. More recent technologies (such as blogs and wikis) are not mentioned.

In its form, the work alludes to Martin Luther's Ninety-Five Theses, a central text of the Protestant Reformation.

The work asserts that the term "cluetrain" stems from an anonymous source speaking about their former corporate employer: "The clue train stopped there four times a day for ten years and they never took delivery."

The Cluetrain Manifesto was re-published as an extended 10th Anniversary Edition in 2010. In 2015, two of the authors, Doc Searls and David Weinberger, posted New Clues, a follow-up to the work.

== The 'Cluetrain' theses ==
A single paragraph summarizes the essential position taken by the writers:

A powerful global conversation has begun. Through the Internet, people are discovering and inventing new ways to share relevant knowledge with blinding speed. As a direct result, markets are getting smarter—and getting smarter faster than most companies.

A reading of the '95 theses' can lead to a number of divisions or aggregations, it is possible to make a somewhat arbitrary split of the listed theses as a basis for understanding the content of the printed publication and a simplified structural view of the main suppositions of the authors.

=== Theses 1–6: Markets are Conversations ===
Historically, the authors state, the marketplace was a location where groups of individual gathered and talked to each other (thesis 1): they would discuss available products, price, reputation and in doing so connect with others (theses 2–5.) The authors then assert that the internet is providing a means for anyone connected to the internet to re-enter such a virtual marketplace and once again achieve such a level of communication between people. This, prior to the internet, had not been available in the age of mass media (thesis 6.)

=== Thesis 7: Hyperlinks Subvert Hierarchy ===
The ability of the internet to link to additional information – information which might exist beyond the formal hierarchy of organizational structure or published material from such an organization – acts as a means of subverting, or bypassing, formal hierarchies.

=== Theses 8–13: Connection between the new markets and companies ===
The same technology connecting people into markets outside of organizations, is also connecting employees within organizations (thesis 8.) The authors suggest that these networks create a more informed marketplace/consumer (thesis 9) through the conversations being held. The information available in the marketplace is superior to that available from the organizations themselves (thesis 10–12.)

The authors, through the remaining theses, then examine the impact that these changes will have on organizations and how, in turn, organizations will need to respond to the changing marketplace to remain viable.

=== Theses 14 – 25: Organizations entering the marketplace ===
With the emergence of the virtual marketplace, the authors indicate that the onus will be on organizations to enter the marketplace conversation (thesis 25) and do so in a way that connects with the ‘voice’ of the new marketplace (thesis 14–16) or risk becoming irrelevant (thesis 16).

=== Theses 26–40: Marketing & Organizational Response ===
The authors then list a number of theses that deal with the approach that they believe organizations will need to adopt if they are to successfully enter the new marketplace (thesis 26) as it is claimed that those within the new marketplace will no longer respond to the previously issued mass-media communications as such communication is not ‘authentic’ (thesis 33.)

=== Theses 41–52: Intranets and the impact to organization control and structure ===
More fully exploring the impact of the intranet within organizations, theses forty-one through fifty-two elaborate on the subversion of hierarchy initially listed as thesis seven. When implemented correctly (theses 44–46), it is suggested that such intranets re-establish real communication amongst employees in parallel with the impact of the internet to the marketplace (thesis 48) and this will lead to a 'hyperlinked' organizational structure within the organization which will take the place of (or be utilized in place of) the formally documented organization chart (thesis 50).

=== Theses 53–71: Connecting the Internet marketplace with corporate Intranets ===
The ideal, according to the work, is for the networked marketplace to be connected to the networked intranet so that full communication can exist between those within the marketplace and those within the company itself (thesis 53.) Achieving this level of communication is hindered by the imposition of ‘command and control’ structures (thesis 54–58) but, ultimately, organizations will need to allow this level of communication to exist as the new marketplace will no longer respond to the mass-media ‘voice’ of the organization (theses 59–71)

=== Theses 72–95: New Market Expectations ===
Theses seventy-two through ninety-five aim to identify the expectations (theses 76, 77, 78, 95) and changes (thesis 72) that exist within the new marketplace and how those expectations and changes will require a corresponding change from organizations (theses 79, 84, 91, 92, 94).

== Reception ==
The ninety-five theses as initially posted to the web received positive reviews in mainstream publications such as the San Jose Mercury News and the Wall Street Journal. They were also widely discussed online, provoking almost religious argument in some cases. Vocal adherents included technically oriented people, who were adept in building websites, writing blogs and making themselves heard on the Internet.

The book quickly became a business bestseller and entered the top ten of Business Week's "Best-Sellers of 2000" list.

The Cluetrain Manifesto has been credited with setting out "the guiding principles of social media years before Facebook and Twitter existed." It is also considered a foundational text in the field of conversational marketing; Advertising Age proclaimed in 2006: "the grand vision outlined in 1999's 'Cluetrain Manifesto' is now coming true. Consumers have control, markets are conversations and marketing is evolving into a two-way discipline."

The book has been criticized for casting its central term of human "voice" in expressivist rather than rhetorical terms.

Some critics consider the work's public reception to be cult-like. John C. Dvorak, for example, dismisses the work as a product of "lunatic fringe dingbat thinking that characterized the Internet boom" and rebukes its adherents for their "apparent faith in this odd vision of an idealistic human-oriented internetworked new world/new economy."

Other critics point to the fact that the Internet cannot be conceptualized simply as "a conversation" or that human activity online cannot be reduced to the notion of a "conversation".

In 2009 Andrew Cherwenka in The Huffington Post argued that the work's predictions had still largely failed to materialize.

== See also ==
- Web 2.0
