= Christopher Locke =

Christopher Locke (November 12, 1947 – December 20, 2021) was an American business analyst, consultant, journalist, author and speaker. He is known as a coauthor of The Cluetrain Manifesto, and author of two other books: Gonzo Marketing: Winning Through Worst Practices, and The Bombast Transcripts: Rants and Screeds of RageBoy. In a Financial Times Group survey from 2001, Locke was named as one of the fifty leading business thinkers in the world.

== Career ==
In the late 1970s, Christopher Locke was working as a construction contractor and cabinet maker, but was forced out of business in the housing downturn of the early 1980s.

His interest in artificial intelligence secured him a number of jobs in Tokyo between 1983 and 1985: He was working as a documentation editor for Fujitsu and the Ricoh Software Research Center, and as a technical editor at the Japanese government's Fifth Generation Computer Systems project.

In 1986, Locke was working in the marketing department of Carnegie Group, an artificial intelligence firm in Pittsburgh, Pennsylvania, where he became vice president of corporate communications, a position he also held at Intelligent Technology, another AI firm in Pittsburgh.

He was director of industrial relations for the Robotics Institute at Carnegie Mellon University before joining Cimlinc in a similar capacity in 1991.

In 1993, Locke founded Internet Business Report, an industry newsletter owned by CMP Publications. Serving as the publication's chief editor, he argued for the commercial use of the Internet. His emphasis on respecting the norms of the "Internet community" provoked a disagreement over editorial direction with the publisher and led to his departure.

In 1994 he initiated and oversaw the development and launch of MecklerWeb, an ambitious project that sought to introduce commerce to the Internet and garnered much attention in the business press. Locke's e-commerce concept was abandoned two weeks after the launch by the site owner, who chose to turn MecklerWeb's into a conventional product catalog.

Locke subsequently worked as editor and publisher of the Net Editors segment on internetMCI, and as Program Director for Online Community Development at IBM.

After leaving IBM, in 1996 and 1997, Locke served as vice president of business development for Displaytech in Longmont, Colorado. In 1997, he set up as an internet consultant under the name Entropy Web Consulting in Boulder, Colorado, practising an alternative to mass marketing he named 'gonzo marketing' after Hunter S. Thompson's gonzo journalism. Gonzo marketing asserts that companies are ineffective in their use of the Internet as a marketing tool when they insist on lecturing instead of conversing, and that companies need to improve their communications with customers to improve the quality of their products and services.

In 2004 Locke accepted a job as consultant and Chief Blogging Officer for HighBeam Research.

== Works ==
Locke's first publications in print were introductory articles on Lisp and natural language processing. He has since written for Wired, Release 1.0, The Industry Standard, Harvard Business Review and many other publications. From 2005 onward, he wrote the Mystic Bourgeoisie blog.

In 1996, he launched Entropy Gradient Reversals, a "strange webzine" that specialized in "dissecting transparently clueless corporate Internet strategies" and introduced RageBoy, Locke's intemperate alter ego who had a penchant for ranting against business orthodoxy. As of April 1999, the publication counted nearly 3,000 subscribers.

Locke was a co-author of The Cluetrain Manifesto, a tract that admonishes businesses to join the "networked conversations" of the Internet. The Manifesto was first posted to the Web in March 1999 and became a business bestseller in an extended book version the next year. In 2009 the book was re-issued as a tenth anniversary edition with a new chapter from each of the original co-authors and commentaries by three new contributors. Locke's new chapter, "Obedient Poodles for God and Country," offers a scathing critique of the fake spirituality the author deems pervasive in contemporary American culture.

Locke was also the author of Gonzo Marketing: Winning Through Worst Practices, a book that expands on the Cluetrain Manifesto's themes, and of The Bombast Transcripts: Rants and Screeds of RageBoy, a compilation of Entropy Gradient Reversals pieces.

Locke has been praised by The Economist for the "wisdom of RageBoy." In a Financial Times Group survey, he was named as one of the fifty leading business thinkers in the world.

He died of chronic obstructive pulmonary disease on December 20, 2021.
