= List of single sign-on implementations =

These are some of the notable Single Sign-On (SSO) implementations available:

Product Name	Project/Vendor	License	Identity management platform	Description
Accounts & SSO	Nokia, Intel,...	Free software		Client-side implementation with plugins for various services/protocols
Active Directory Federation Services	Microsoft	Proprietary		Claims-based system and application federation using SAML 2.0 or WS-Federation
Bitium	Bitium	Proprietary		Enterprise cloud-based identity and access management solution with single sign-on, active directory integration and 2-factor authentication options
CAS / Central Authentication Service	Apereo	Free & Open Source (Apache 2.0)		Protocol and open-source SSO server/client implementation with support for CAS, SAML1, SAML2, OAuth2, SCIM, OpenID Connect and WS-Fed protocols both as an identity provider and a service provider with other auxiliary functions that deal with user consent, access management, impersonation, terms of use, etc. Licensed under Apache 2.0.
CoSign single sign on	University of Michigan	Academic		SSO for University of Michigan
Distributed Access Control System (DACS)	Distributed Systems Software	Free Software		
Facebook connect	Facebook	Proprietary		Facebook SSO to third parties enabled by Facebook
FreeIPA	Red Hat	Free Software	Yes	
IceWall SSO	Hewlett-Packard Enterprise	Proprietary		Web and Federated Single Sign-On Solution
IBM Enterprise Identity Mapping	IBM	Free software	Yes	Works with Kerberos (e.g. Active Directory) and other authentication mechanisms to map different identities and hence allow single signon to all IBM server platforms (Windows, Linux, PowerLinux, IBM i, i5/OS, OS/400, AIX) even when the user name differs.
LTPA	IBM	Proprietary		
Imprivata OneSign	Imprivata	Proprietary		
Janrain Federate SSO	Janrain	Proprietary	Yes	Social and conventional user SSO
JOSSO	JOSSO	Free Software		Open Source Single Sign-On Server
Keycloak (Red Hat Single Sign-On)	Red Hat	Open source	Yes	Federated SSO (LDAP and Active Directory), standard protocols (OpenID Connect, OAuth 2.0 and SAML 2.0) for Web, clustering and single sign on. Red Hat Single Sign-On is version of Keycloak for which RedHat provides commercial support.
Microsoft account	Microsoft	Proprietary		Microsoft single sign-on web service
Microsoft Azure EntraID	Microsoft	Proprietary	Yes	Cloud based single sign-on which supports SAML 2.0, WS-Federation, and OpenID Connect
myOneLogin	VMware	Proprietary		Cloud single sign-on
NetIQ Access Manager	Microfocus	Proprietary	Yes, used in conjunction with NetIQ Identity Manager	Access Management, Federation and Risk-Based Access Control platform
Numina Application Framework	Numina Solutions	Proprietary	Yes	Single sign-on system for Windows (OpenID RP & OP, SAML IdP, and proprietary)
Okta	Okta, Inc.		Yes	Okta is SaaS based identity management and Single Sign On service provider which supports SAML 2.0, OpenID Connect and other protocols
OneLogin	OneLogin Inc.	Proprietary	Yes	Cloud-based identity and access management with single sign-on (SSO) and active directory integration
OpenAthens	Jisc	Proprietary	Yes	Identity and access management solutions to IdPs and SPs enabling access management to web-based resources. Fully hosted service with several directory integration options, dedicated support team. Maintains OpenAthens Federation. SAML 1.1, SAML 2.0, SSO, self-reg, compatibility with Shibboleth, API.
OpenAM	Open Identity Platform Community	CDDL	Yes, used in conjunction with OpenDJ and OpenIDM	Access management, entitlements and federation server platform
Oracle Identity Management	Oracle Corporation	Proprietary	Yes	Identity and Access Management Suite of products from Oracle
SecureLogin	NetIQ	Proprietary		Enterprise Single-Sign-On
Shibboleth	Shibboleth	Free & Open Source (Apache 2.0)		SAML-based open source access control
Ubuntu Single Sign On	Canonical Ltd.	Proprietary		OpenID-based SSO for Launchpad and Ubuntu services
Univention Corporate Server	Univention	Free & Open Source		Enterprise IAM with single sign-on using SAML
WSO2 Identity Server	WSO2	Free & Open Source (Apache 2.0)	Yes	SAML 2.0, OpenID, OpenID Connect, OAuth 2.0, SCIM, XACML, Passive Federation
ZXID	ZXID	Free Software	Yes	Reference Implementation of TAS3 security

== See also ==
- List of OAuth providers
- Identity management
- Identity management systems
- OpenID
- SAML 2.0
- SAML-based products and services
