= List of OAuth providers =

This page is a list of notable OAuth service providers.

Service provider	OAuth protocol	OpenID Connect
Amazon	2.0	
AOL	2.0	
Autodesk	1.0,2.0	
Apple	2.0	Yes
Basecamp	2.0	No
Battle.net	2.0	
Bitbucket	1.0a 2.0	No
bitly	2.0	
Box	2.0	
ClearScore	2.0	
Cloud Foundry	2.0	
Dailymotion	2.0 draft 11	
Deutsche Telekom	2.0	
DeviantArt	2.0 drafts 10 and 15	
Discogs	1.0a	
Discord	2.0	No
Dropbox	1.0, 2.0	
Etsy	1.0	
Evernote	1.0a	
Facebook	2.0 draft 12	Yes
FatSecret	1.0, 2.0	
Fitbit	2.0	
Flickr	1.0a	
Formstack	2.0	
Foursquare	2.0	
GitHub	2.0	No
GitLab	2.0	Yes
Goodreads	1.0	
Google	2.0	Yes
Google App Engine	1.0a, 2.0	Yes
Groundspeak	1.0	
Huddle	2.0	
Imgur	2.0	
Instagram	2.0	No
Intel Cloud Services	2.0	
Jive Software	1.0a, 2.0	
Kakao	2.0	Yes
Keycloak	2.0	Yes
Kick	2.0	
LinkedIn	2.0	Yes
Microsoft services (Note: Hotmail, Windows Live, Messenger, Entra ID (formally Azure Active Directory), Xbox)	2.0	Yes
Mixi	1.0	
MySpace	1.0a	
Netflix	1.0a	
NetIQ	1.0a, 2.0	Yes
Okta	1.0a, 2.0	Yes
OpenAM	2.0	
OpenStreetMap	1.0a, 2.0	
OpenTable	1.0a	
ORCID	2.0	
PayPal	2.0	Yes
Ping Identity	2.0	
Pixiv	2.0	
Plurk	1.0a	
Reddit	2.0	
Roblox	2.0	Yes
Salesforce.com	1.0a, 2.0	Yes
Sina Weibo	2.0	
Spotify	2.0	No
Stack Exchange	2.0	No
StatusNet	1.0a	
Strava	2.0	
Stripe	2.0	
TikTok	2.0	
Trello	1.0	
Tumblr	1.0a	
Twitch	2.0	Yes
Ubuntu One	1.0	No
Viadeo	2.0	
Vimeo	2.0	No
VK	2.0	No
WeChat	2.0	No
Withings	2.0	
WooCommerce	1.0a	
WordPress.com	1.0a, 2.0	
WSO2 Identity Server	1.0a, 2.0	Yes
X	1.0a, 2.0	No
Xero	1.0a, 2.0	Yes
XING	2.0	
Yahoo!	1.0a, 2.0	
Yammer	2.0	
Yandex	2.0	No
Yelp	2.0	
Zendesk	2.0	

== See also ==
- List of single sign-on implementations
