= Ubuntu Single Sign On =

- Developer: Canonical
- Written in: Python
- Platform: Launchpad; Ubuntu OS; Ubuntu One; Ubuntu One Music Store; Ubuntu Software Center
- Available in: English
- Type: Single sign-on
- License: AGPLv3
- Website: login.ubuntu.com

Ubuntu Single Sign On (also known as Ubuntu SSO, Launchpad Login Service) is an OpenID-based single sign-on service provided by Canonical to allow users to log into many websites.

On June 21, 2013, Canonical announced that Ubuntu Single Sign On would be re-branded under Ubuntu One as part of consolidating Canonical's online services under the Ubuntu One brand.

== Product overview ==
An Ubuntu Single Sign On account gave users access to the Canonical Store, Launchpad, Ubuntu One and other Ubuntu services. Other sites that support OpenID authorization also had support for Ubuntu SSO.

Ubuntu Single Sign On account could also be used for authenticating to desktop applications such as the "Ubuntu One Music Store" plugin for Rhythmbox and Banshee, Ubuntu One and Ubuntu Software Center. This goal was reached by using Ubuntu Single Sign On Client application.

== Rebranding ==
As of June 2013, the Ubuntu Single Sign On account brand was rebranded under the Ubuntu One brand, consolidating the Ubuntu user's online experience. Users can still access the Canonical Store, Launchpad, Ubuntu One, the Ubuntu Software Center, and other Ubuntu services; however, due to lack of interest, the Ubuntu One Music Store plugin for Rhythmbox was removed from the interface.

== See also ==
- Ubuntu
- Ubuntu One
- OpenID
