= Bitium =

SaaS startup acquired by Google

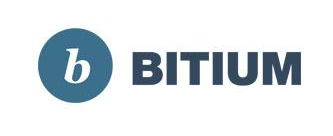
- Type: Subsidiary
- Industry: Cloud computing
- Founded: 2012; 14 years ago
- Founders: Erik Gustavson; Scott Kriz
- Defunct: 2019
- Successor: Google Cloud
- Headquarters: Santa Monica, California
- Key people: Scott Kriz, CEO
- Products: Bitium single sign-on and identity management
- Parent: Google
- Website: https://www.bitium.com

Bitium developed the cloud service Bitium, which provided single sign-on and identity management for software as a service (SaaS) cloud-based applications before its merger into Google Cloud. Bitium allowed end users to access all of their cloud software accounts using a single set of login credentials. The product could integrate with cloud apps using SAML for enhanced security.

Bitium also allowed companies to extend their existing directory structured to cloud apps. Bitium could integrate with Active Directory, LDAP, HRIS, Google Apps and other on-premises directories to allow for centralized user access and control.

Bitium was founded by Erik Gustavson and Scott Kriz.

Bitium was backed by venture capital firm Polaris Partners and was an early graduate of the Amplify.LA accelerator. The corporate office was located in a building which was the former studio of artist Richard Diebenkorn. Bitium had been featured at CIO.com.

Google acquired the company in 2017.

== Acquisition ==
On September 26, 2017, Google Cloud announced that it acquired Bitium, a step towards better management of enterprise-grade cloud customer services across an organization, through integration of features like setting security levels and access policies for applications. At the end of September 2018, Bitium announced that it would close down all accounts for customers outside the United States, Canada and Mexico at the end of 2018.

Bitium was fully merged with Google Cloud and ceased to exist in 2019. However, some of its technology is still used by Google.

== See also ==
- List of single sign-on implementations
