= MyOneLogin =

myOneLogin was a Secure Cloud Identity Services platform launched by TriCipher in 2008. It allows users access to many applications with a single secure login, addressing Identity and Access Management challenges. All services are fully integrated and deliver on-demand with no need to deploy hardware, software, or modifying applications.

TriCipher was founded in 2000 and is headquartered in Los Gatos, California. TriCipher was acquired by VMware, Inc. in September 2010.

== See also ==
- Identity management
- Single sign-on
- List of single sign-on implementations
