= CentralAuth =

CentralAuth may mean:

- Central Authentication Service, a single sign-on protocol for the web.
- Special:CentralAuth, a special page on Wikimedia wikis used to view a user's global account details, attached local wikis, total edit counts, and global permissions.
