= Imprivata =

Identity management company based in Waltham, Massachusetts

Imprivata is a digital identity security company based in Waltham, Massachusetts. Their first product came to market in 2004, and they expanded into Europe in 2006.

In 2017, Imprivata had over 1,700 clients and several offices across America, Europe and Australia. Imprivata customers are primarily from the healthcare industry. Imprivata became a public company on June 25, 2014, and was listed on the New York Stock Exchange, until it was acquired by private equity investment firm Thoma Bravo in 2016.

In 2019, they acquired GroundControl to expand their mobile offerings; in 2020, FairWarning to expand their Digital Identity platform; and more recently, Xton Technologies and SecureLink to deliver privileged access management (PAM) both for internal and external users.

== History ==
Imprivata was founded by David Ting and Phil Scarfo, who had developed identity management technology while working at Polaroid Corporation’s small business incubator.

The company shipped its first product, the OneSign Enterprise Single Sign-on appliance, in 2004. In 2005, Imprivata expanded to Europe, Africa and the Middle East, and in 2006 Imprivata founder David Ting was selected by InfoWorld as one of the top 25 chief technology officers of the year.

In 2009, Imprivata acquired the assets of IdentiPHI, a manufacturer and reseller of biometric technology, including the SAFsolution product line, and in 2011, acquired assets of Validus Medical Systems of Santa Cruz, California, which was incorporated into the Imprivata Cortext technology.

In July 2016, Imprivata announced that it agreed to be acquired by Thoma Bravo, a private equity firm based in San Francisco, for $19.25 per share, estimated at a total of $544 million. Omar Hussain was the chief executive at the time.

== Technology ==
Imprivata OneSign helps companies manage user access and authentication. Product reviews suggest that OneSign allows companies to enable all enterprise applications for single sign-on without requiring custom scripting or modifications to existing directories. OneSign can also strengthen user authentication to desktops and networks by replacing passwords with a range of authentication options that include finger biometrics, proximity cards, smart cards, many national and government ID cards, One-Time-Password tokens, and an employee’s physical location. Product reviews also comment on OneSign's ability to simplify compliance reporting by consolidating the employee strong authentication and application access events in a single database.
