= CoSign single sign on =

- Developer: Research Systems Unix Group
- Operating system: Cross-platform
- Website: weblogin.org

Cosign is an open-source project originally designed by the Research Systems Unix Group to provide the University of Michigan with a secure single sign-on web authentication system. It is no longer being updated.

Cosign authenticates a user on the web server and then provides an environment variable for the user's name. When the user accesses a part of the site that requires authentication, the presence of that variable allows access without having to sign on again.

Cosign is part of the National Science Foundation Middleware Initiative (NMI) EDIT software release.

== See also ==
- Central Authentication Service
- Stanford WebAuth
- University of Minnesota CookieAuth
- Shibboleth (Internet2)
