= JOSSO =

Identity and Access Management platform

Java Open Single Sign On
- Initial release: October 19, 2010
- Stable release: 2.4.3 / May 29, 2017; 8 years ago
- Written in: Java
- Operating system: Cross-platform
- Type: Identity and access management
- License: LGPL License
- Website: www.josso.org

Java Open Single Sign On (JOSSO) is an open source Identity and Access Management (IAM) platform for rapid and standards-based Cloud-scale Single Sign-On, web services security, authentication and provisioning.

== See also ==
- Shibboleth (Internet2)
- CAS
- Digital certificates
- List of single sign-on implementations
