= Larry Drebes =

American businessman

- Born: April 20, 1967 (age 59); St. Louis, United States
- Education: Maryville University
- Occupations: Founder, Janrain
- Spouse: Karen Drebes

Larry Drebes (born April 20, 1967) is an American businessman and the co-founder of Janrain, Four11 Corporation, and Desktop.com. He was also an early leader of the OpenID initiative, which was widely supported by Google, Yahoo!, and other providers of online identity.

== Career ==
In 1992, Drebes was a co-founder and Chief Technology Officer of Four11 Corporation, the parent company of Rocketmail, an early webmail provider. Four11 was acquired by Yahoo in October 1997 for $97 million, and RocketMail became Yahoo! Mail.

Drebes then founded Desktop.com in 1999 and secured $29 million in financing. The company was shut down in 2001 after giving back about half the venture capital it received.

In 2002, Drebes began working closely with the early proponents of the OpenID protocol. In response to his work, he founded Janrain in 2002 to build software for user management based on OpenID. The company is perhaps best known for its social ID login technology, which allows users of Facebook, Google and many other social networks to log into any web site using previously established social IDs. Janrain has received over $79 million in venture capital funding, including $15.5 million in 2011, $33 million in 2013, and $27 million in 2015.

== Personal life and education ==
Drebes was born in St. Louis. He graduated from St. Paul's School and then earned a BS in Marketing from Maryville University.

Drebes is married to Karen Drebes and has three children.
