= Ubuntu Forums =

- Website type: Forum
- Available in: English
- Successor: Ubuntu Community Discourse
- Owner: Canonical Ltd.
- Website: ubuntuforums.org
- Registration: Yes, using Ubuntu One
- Launched: October 2004
- Current status: Offline

The Ubuntu Forums was the official forum for the Ubuntu operating system.

As of May 2022, The Ubuntu Forums had 2.1 million registered members and more than 2.2 million threads. The Ubuntu Forums currently runs on the forum software vBulletin.

On July 20, 2013 the site was compromised, with attacker(s) both defacing the site and gaining access to "all user email addresses and hashed passwords"

The site was compromised once again on July 15, 2016. "Usernames, email addresses and IPs for 2 million users" were compromised but 'no active passwords' were accessed.

In November 2024 the medium for the support and discussion of Ubuntu Linux was changed from Ubuntu Forums to Ubuntu Discourse, and subsequently the Ubuntu Forums website was closed down. Original post content from the closed down forum was later made available on GitHub.

== History ==
The Ubuntu Forums were created by Ryan Troy in October 2004. The forums became a popular resource for Ubuntu and were deemed the Official Ubuntu Forums in November 2004. The forums hosting continued to be paid for by Ryan and the occasional donations of forum members until March 2006, when Canonical offered to host the forums on its own servers. In June 2007, the forums' domain name, license, and assets were all transferred to Canonical, which then had sole ownership.

== Role ==
The primary function of The Ubuntu Forums was for Ubuntu support, but it also had a popular community area where other topics may be discussed.

== Governance ==
The Ubuntu Forums were governed by a moderation team made up of volunteers, often referred to as The Forum Staff. The Forum Staff had three ranks: Administrators, Super Moderators and Moderators. The Administrators served on the Forum Council.

== See also ==
- List of Internet forums
