= Accounts & SSO =

Single sign-on framework for computers

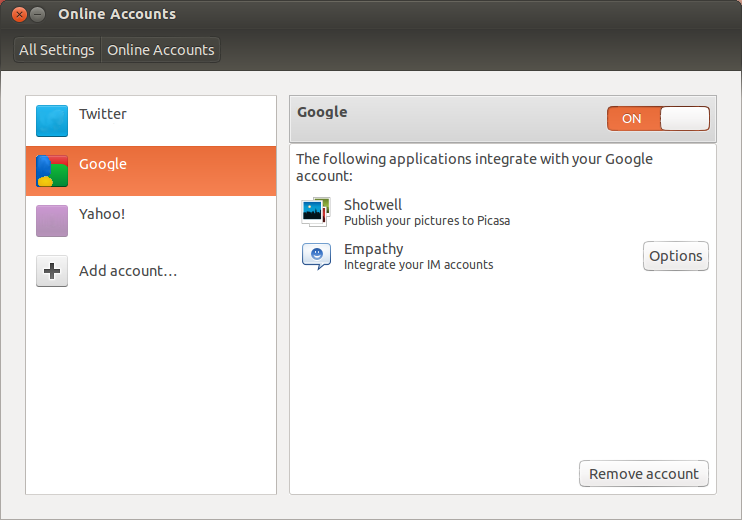
- Accounts & SSO as used by Ubuntu
- Original author: Nokia
- Developers: Intel, Canonical Ltd, KDE
- Initial release: November 16, 2009; 16 years ago
- Stable release: Varying
- Written in: C (glib), C++ (Qt)
- Operating system: Unix-like
- Available in: Multilingual
- Type: Single sign-on framework
- License: GNU LGPL 2.1
- Website: accounts-sso.gitlab.io

Accounts & SSO, accounts-sso, or lately gSSO is a single sign-on framework for computers.

Originating as part of Maemo 5 Accounts-SSO is free software licensed under LGPL 2.1. Accounts-SSO was deployed as a standard component of Nokia N900, Nokia N9, Tizen, and Ubuntu. Later it was integrated in KDE Plasma Workspaces.

== History ==
Accounts-SSO was originally developed by Nokia who eventually shipped it as part of Maemo 5 on November 16, 2009.

It was later integrated into MeeGo 1.2 Handset software platform which was formally released on May 18, 2011.

After the MeeGo project ended, Accounts-SSO was transferred into an independent project by Intel. Canonical Ltd then adopted Accounts-SSO for Ubuntu 12.10 (later also Ubuntu Touch) and KDE integrated it in November 2012.

== Features ==
Among Accounts-SSO's features are a plugin-based architecture, working with diverse user interfaces, storage back-ends, and varying levels of security.

While Accounts-SSO is primarily being used for centralized login management to social networking services, e.g. sharing photos to a service from an image managing application and chatting on the same service from an instant messenger, its plugin-based architecture also allows for local usage, such as disk encryption for which a cryptsetup plugin for Accounts-SSO was developed.

The Accounts-SSO framework consists of several individually released components:

- signond: A daemon providing the SSO service over D-Bus – originally Qt-based, it's being rewritten by Intel using only GLib.
- libaccounts-glib: GLib-based client library for managing the accounts database.
- libaccounts-qt: Client library for managing the accounts database for Qt-based applications – implemented as wrapper around libaccounts-glib.
- libsignon-glib: GLib-based client library for applications handling account authentication through the signond Single Sign-On service.
- signon plugins: A handful of signond authentication plugins are developed within the Accounts-SSO project. Among them plugins for Digest access, OAuth, SASL, and X.509.
- account plugins: The Accounts-SSO project leaves development of plugins for specific services to 3rd parties. Open source plugins for various services (Facebook, Google, Twitter,...) are being developed by Canonical.

== See also ==
- List of single sign-on implementations
