= Social login =

Authentication with a social networking account

Social login is a form of single sign-on using existing information from a social networking service such as Facebook, Twitter or Google, to login to a third party website instead of creating a new login account specifically for that website. It is designed to simplify logins for end users as well as provide more reliable demographic information to web developers.

== How social login works ==
Social login links accounts from one or more social networking services to a website, typically using either a plug-in or a widget. By selecting the desired social networking service, the user simply uses his or her login for that service to sign on to the website. This, in turn, negates the need for the end user to remember login information for multiple electronic commerce and other websites while providing site owners with uniform demographic information as provided by the social networking service. Many sites which offer social login also offer more traditional online registration for those who either desire it or who do not have an account with a compatible social networking service (and therefore would be precluded from creating an account with the website).

== Application ==
Social login can be implemented strictly as an authentication system using standards such as OpenID or SAML. For consumer websites that offer social functionality to users, social login is often implemented using the OAuth standard. OAuth is a secure authorization protocol which is commonly used in conjunction with authentication to grant 3rd party applications a "session token" allowing them to make API calls to providers on the user's behalf. Sites using the social login in this manner typically offer social features such as commenting, sharing, reactions and gamification.

While social login can be extended to corporate websites, the majority of social networks and consumer-based identity providers allow self-asserted identities. For this reason, social login is generally not used for strict, highly secure applications such as those in banking or health.

== Advantages of social login ==
Studies have shown that website registration forms are inefficient as many people provide false data, forget their login information for the site or simply decline to register in the first place. A study conducted in 2011 by Janrain and Blue Research found that 77 percent of consumers favored social login as a means of authentication over more traditional online registration methods. Additional benefits:

Targeted Content
Web sites can obtain a profile and social graph data in order to target personalized content to the user. This includes information such as name, email, hometown, interests, activities, and friends. However, this can create issues for privacy, and result in a narrowing of the variety of views and options available on the internet.
Multiple Identities
Users can log into websites with multiple social identities allowing them to better control their online identity.
Registration Data
Many websites use the profile data returned from social login instead of having users manually enter their PII (Personally Identifiable Information) into web forms. This can potentially speed up the registration or sign-up process.
Pre-validated Email
Identity providers who support email such as Google and Yahoo! can return the user's email address to the 3rd party website preventing the user from supplying a fabricated email address during the registration process.
Account linking
Because social login can be used for authentication, many websites allow legacy users to link pre-existing site account with their social login account without forcing re-registration.

== Disadvantages of social login ==
Utilizing social login through platforms such as Facebook may unintentionally render third-party websites useless within certain libraries, schools, or workplaces which block social networking services for productivity reasons. It can also cause difficulties in countries with active censorship regimes, such as China and its "Golden Shield Project", where the third party website may not be actively censored, but is effectively blocked if a user's social login is blocked.

There are several other risks that come with using social login tools. These logins are also a new frontier for fraud and account abuse as attackers use sophisticated means to hack these authentication mechanisms. This can result in an unwanted increase in fraudulent account creations, or worse; attackers successfully stealing social media account credentials from legitimate users.

== Security ==
In March 2012, a research paper reported an extensive study on the security of social login mechanisms. The authors found 8 serious logic flaws in high-profile ID providers and relying party websites, such as OpenID (including Google ID and PayPal Access), Facebook, Janrain, Freelancer, FarmVille, Sears.com, etc. Because the researchers informed ID providers and the third party websites that relied on the service prior to public announcement of the discovery of the flaws, the vulnerabilities were corrected, and there have been no security breaches reported. This research concludes that the overall security quality of SSO deployments seems worrisome.

Moreover, social logins are often implemented in an insecure way. Users, in this case, have to trust every application which implemented this feature to handle their identifier confidentially.

Furthermore, by placing reliance on an account which is operable on many websites, social login creates a single point of failure, thus considerably augmenting the damage that would be caused were the account to be hacked.

== List of providers ==
Here is a list of services that provide social login features which they encourage other websites to use. Related are federated identity login providers.

- Alipay
- AOL
- Apple
- Facebook
- Google
- KakaoTalk
- Line
- LinkedIn
- Myspace
- PayPal
- QQ
- Sina Weibo
- Taobao
- Vkontakte (ВКонтакте)
- Twitter
- WeChat

== See also ==
- Single sign-on
- Authentication vs. Authorization
