= Ubuntu One =

Cloud service operated by Canonical Ltd.

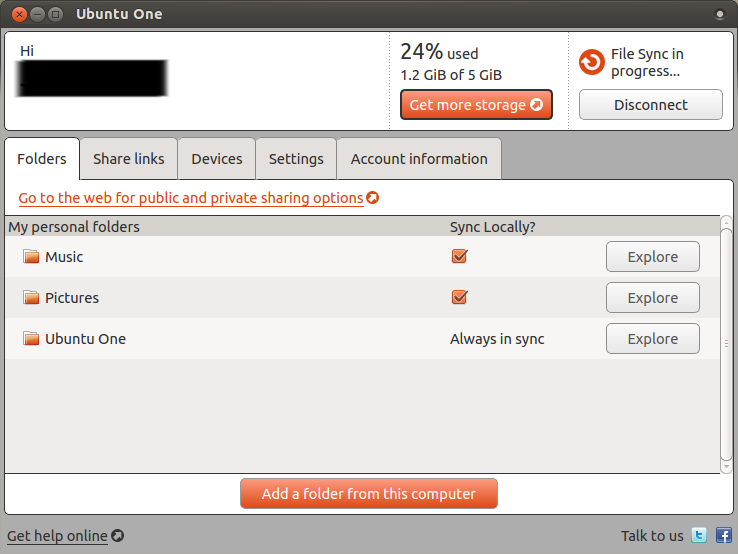
- Ubuntu One Desktop client on Ubuntu 13.04
- Developer: Canonical Ltd.
- Release: May 13, 2009; 17 years ago
- Written in: Python
- Operating system: Ubuntu 9.10 – 13.10; Mac OS X 10.6 and higher Microsoft Windows iOS; Linux; Android
- Platform: Launchpad; Ubuntu OS; Ubuntu Forums; Ubuntu One; Ubuntu One Music Store; Ubuntu Software Center
- Available in: English
- Type: Cloud service & single sign on service
- License: Server-side: Proprietary; Client-side: GPLv3
- Website: Formerly one.ubuntu.com at the Wayback Machine (archived March 28, 2014)

Ubuntu One is an OpenID-based single sign-on service operated by Canonical Ltd. to allow users to log onto many Canonical-owned Web sites. Until April 2014, Ubuntu One was also a file hosting service and music store that allowed users to store data "in the cloud".

The service enabled users to store files online and sync them between computers and mobile devices, as well as stream audio and music from cloud to mobile devices.

In April 2014, Canonical announced that the cloud storage and synchronization features would be shut down at the end of July 31 of 2014, leaving the sign-on features intact.

== Features ==
Ubuntu One had a client application that ran on Ubuntu 9.04 and later, Windows XP or newer, and Mac OS X 10.6 and higher. Other Linux distributions not running GNOME were supported through a console client. The source code is available through launchpad and can be compiled for other Unix-like operating systems, such as FreeBSD. There was an Ubuntu One music app for iOS devices. A free Ubuntu One account offered 5 GB of storage.

The Ubuntu One service was similar to Microsoft OneDrive, iCloud, Dropbox, Google Play Music, Amazon Cloud Player. Its client code was written in Python. It used Twisted for its low-level networking and Protocol Buffers for protocol description. Data was synced over a custom protocol called "ubuntuone-storageprotocol", and stored on Amazon S3.

Ubuntu One offered automatic upload of photos taken from Android mobile devices for immediate synchronization across computers; integration with Mozilla Thunderbird for contacts and with Tomboy for notes due to the access to the local CouchDB instance. It also had capabilities for purchasing DRM-free music while synchronizing them automatically with an Ubuntu One Account via the Ubuntu One Music Store (in partnership with 7digital).

Ubuntu One published APIs for developers wishing to build applications with file and data synchronization or music streaming.

An Ubuntu One account gave users access to the Canonical Store, Launchpad, Ubuntu One and other Ubuntu services; an Ubuntu One account allowed users to store files within the cloud, store their contacts details within the interface, access the Ubuntu One Music Store to buy music from and activate the Ubuntu Software Center. Other sites that support OpenID authorization also had support for Ubuntu One.

== History ==
In June 2013, the Ubuntu Single Sign On account was re-branded under Ubuntu One as part of consolidating Canonical's online services under the Ubuntu One brand. Also, the announcement identified Ubuntu Pay as another service to come under the brand. Following a security breach in July 2013, Canonical put the Ubuntu Forums under the brand, meaning that Forum users now log in using Ubuntu One, rather than with the previous username-password system.

On April 2, 2014, Canonical announced shutting down of select Ubuntu One services. As of the day of announcement, it was no longer possible to purchase storage space or music. File services would be unavailable from June 1, but existing users were allowed to download their content until July 31, when all stored data would be permanently deleted. Canonical explained that they were not willing to make more investment in Ubuntu One, which would be required to compete with other services. Instead, their priority is making a "converged operating system for phones, tablets, desktops." The company also announced plans to release the source code for the Ubuntu One server software to the public under an open-source license. The shutdown of cloud storage and synchronization services does not affect the single sign-on function of Ubuntu One, which will remain in place.

On July 31, 2014 the service was shut down and all of the users' files were deleted.

In August 2015 Canonical released the file syncing code under the GNU AGPL. Some other server parts remain to be released, with no ETA.

== Reception ==
Ubuntu One has been criticized within the Ubuntu community for using proprietary server software.

There was no native client integration for the Kubuntu variant of the Ubuntu operating system, as of January 2013. Kubuntu integration was under development and had also received a grant from the Google Summer of Code 2010.

Further criticism concerned the unclear revenue share that would be granted to the community. The Amarok development team announced that they would not add support for the Ubuntu One Music Store to the Amarok media player for the moment, unlike the Magnatune media store, which returns 10% of the revenue produced via the interface to Amarok.

== Storage ==
Storage was out-sourced to Amazon S3. Files stored in the Ubuntu One file stores were not encrypted.

== See also ==
- Cloud storage
- Remote backup service
- Comparison of file hosting services
- Comparison of online backup services
- Ubuntu Single Sign On
