= Central Authentication Service =

Single sign-on protocol

The Central Authentication Service (CAS) is a single sign-on protocol for the web. Its purpose is to permit a user to access multiple applications while providing their credentials (such as user ID and password) only once. It also allows web applications to authenticate users without gaining access to a user's security credentials, such as a password. The name CAS also refers to a software package that implements this protocol.

== Description ==
The CAS protocol involves at least three parties: a client web browser, the web application requesting authentication, and the CAS server. It may also involve a back-end service, such as a database server, that does not have its own HTTP interface but communicates with a web application.

When the client visits an application requiring authentication, the application redirects it to CAS. CAS validates the client's authenticity, usually by checking a username and password against a database (such as Kerberos, LDAP or Active Directory).

If the authentication succeeds, CAS returns the client to the application, passing along a service ticket. The application then validates the ticket by contacting CAS over a secure connection and providing its own service identifier and the ticket. CAS then gives the application trusted information about whether a particular user has successfully authenticated.

CAS allows multi-tier authentication via proxy address. A cooperating back-end service, like a database or mail server, can participate in CAS, validating the authenticity of users via information it receives from web applications. Thus, a webmail client and a webmail server can all implement CAS.

== History ==
CAS was conceived and developed by Shawn Bayern of Yale University Technology and Planning. It was later maintained by Drew Mazurek at Yale. CAS 1.0 implemented single-sign-on. CAS 2.0 introduced multi-tier proxy authentication. Several other CAS distributions have been developed with new features.

In December 2004, CAS became a project of the Java in Administration Special Interest Group (JASIG), which is as of 2008 responsible for its maintenance and development. Formerly called "Yale CAS", CAS is now also known as "Jasig CAS". In 2010, Jasig entered into talks with the Sakai Foundation to merge the two organizations. The two organizations were consolidated as Apereo Foundation in December 2012.

In December 2006, the Andrew W. Mellon Foundation awarded Yale its First Annual Mellon Award for Technology Collaboration, in the amount of $50,000, for Yale's development of CAS. At the time of that award CAS was in use at "hundreds of university campuses (among other beneficiaries)".

In April 2013, CAS Protocol specification 3.0 was released.

== Implementations ==
=== Apereo CAS Implementation ===
The Apereo CAS server that is the reference implementation of the CAS protocol today supports the following features:

- CAS v1, v2 and v3 Protocol
- SAML v1 and v2 Protocol
- OAuth Protocol
- OpenID & OpenID Connect Protocol
- WS-Federation Passive Requestor Protocol
- Authentication via JAAS, LDAP, RDBMS, X.509, Radius, SPNEGO, JWT, Remote, Trusted, BASIC, Apache Shiro, MongoDB, Pac4J and more.
- Delegated authentication to WS-FED, Facebook, Twitter, SAML IdP, OpenID, OpenID Connect, CAS and more.
- Authorization via ABAC, Time/Date, REST, Internet2's Grouper and more.
- HA clustered deployments via Hazelcast, Ehcache, JPA, Memcached, Apache Ignite, MongoDB, Redis, Couchbase and more.
- Application registration backed by JSON, LDAP, YAML, JPA, Couchbase, MongoDB and more.
- Multifactor authentication via Duo Security, SAASPASS, YubiKey, RSA, Google Authenticator (TOTP) and more.
- Administrative UIs to manage logging, monitoring, statistics, configuration, client registration and more.
- Global and per-application user interface theme and branding.
- Password management and password policy enforcement.

=== Django Implementation ===
==== Django CAS Server ====
- django-mama-cas: A Django Central Authentication Service (CAS) single sign-on server

==== Django CAS Client ====
- django-cas-ng: Django CAS 1.0/2.0/3.0 client authentication library, support Django 2.0, 2.1, 2.2, 3.0 and Python 3.5+

== See also ==
- CoSign single sign on
- JOSSO
- List of single sign-on implementations
- OpenAM
- OpenID
- SAML
- SAML-based products and services
- Shibboleth (software)
