= Fatsecret =

Health website

fatsecret
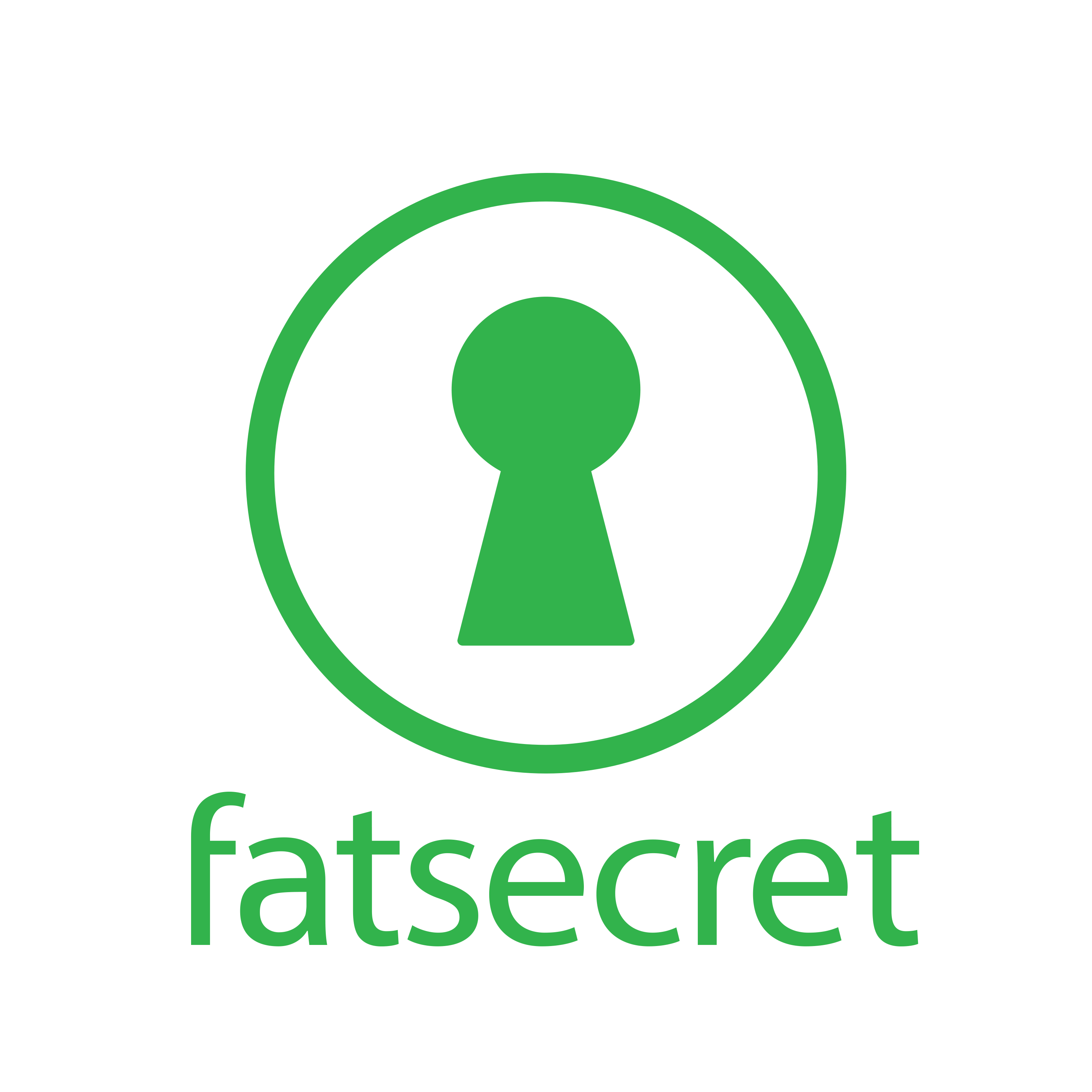
- Developer: Fatsecret
- Initial release: 2007
- Operating system: iOS, Android & Apple Watch
- Available in: 24 languages
- Type: Diet, nutrition and weight loss
- Website: www.fatsecret.com

Fatsecret, commonly styled as fatsecret, is a mobile application, website and API that helps people achieve their weight loss goals and find accurate nutrition information. It also offers a weight loss clinic with coaching and medically supported programs. The platform powers global health apps.

== History ==
Fatsecret was founded in 2006 in Melbourne, Australia by Lenny Moses and Rodney Moses. As of 2019, Lenny serves as the company's CEO. The company is known for its calorie counting and meal tracking app, and by April 2016, the company claimed to have 45 million users of its services. In August 2018, a premium version of its app was released.

Since August 2009, the company has operated the Fatsecret Platform API, which allows access to its global food and nutrition database.

Fatsecret reportedly had 900,000 downloads of its app in January 2020. In an analysis of several Health & Fitness app subcategories for the United States in January 2021, Fatsecret was reported to have the highest 30 day user retention rate of top Calorie Counter + Meal Planner for Weight Loss apps.

== See also ==
- Apple Health
- Google Fit
- Samsung Health
- Fitbit
