= Service provider (SAML) =

System entity that receives and accepts authentication assertions

A SAML service provider is a system entity that receives and accepts authentication assertions in conjunction with a single sign-on (SSO) profile of the Security Assertion Markup Language (SAML).

In the SAML domain model, a SAML relying party is any system entity that receives and accepts information from another system entity. (Note: J. Hodges et al. Glossary for the OASIS Security Assertion Markup Language (SAML) V2.0. OASIS Standard, March 2005. Document identifier: saml-glossary-2.0-os http://docs.oasis-open.org/security/saml/v2.0/saml-glossary-2.0-os.pdf) Of particular interest is a SAML relying party that receives and accepts a SAML assertion issued by a SAML authority.

An important type of SAML authority is the SAML identity provider, a system entity that issues authentication assertions in conjunction with an SSO profile of SAML. (Note: J. Hughes et al. Profiles for the OASIS Security Assertion Markup Language (SAML) V2.0. OASIS Standard, March 2005. Document identifier: saml-profiles-2.0-os http://docs.oasis-open.org/security/saml/v2.0/saml-profiles-2.0-os.pdf (for the latest working draft of this specification with errata, see: https://www.oasis-open.org/committees/download.php/56782/sstc-saml-profiles-errata-2.0-wd-07.pdf)) A relying party that consumes such assertions is called a SAML service provider (or simply service provider if the domain is understood). Thus a SAML service provider is a system entity that receives and accepts an authentication assertion issued by a SAML identity provider.

== See also ==
- Security Assertion Markup Language (SAML)
- SAML identity provider
- SAML-based products and services
