= Janrain =

CIAM start-up based in Portland

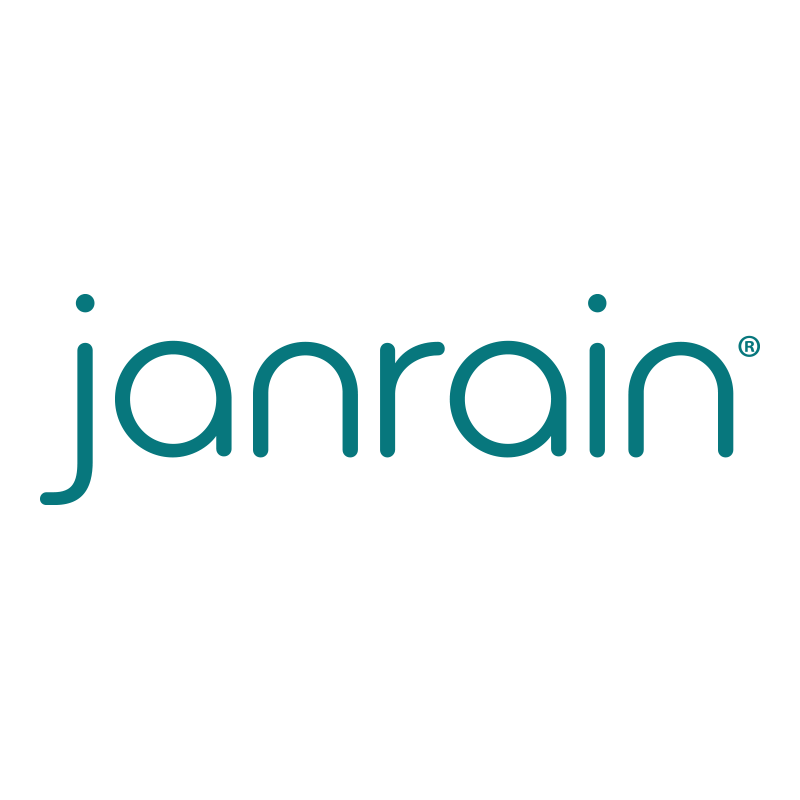

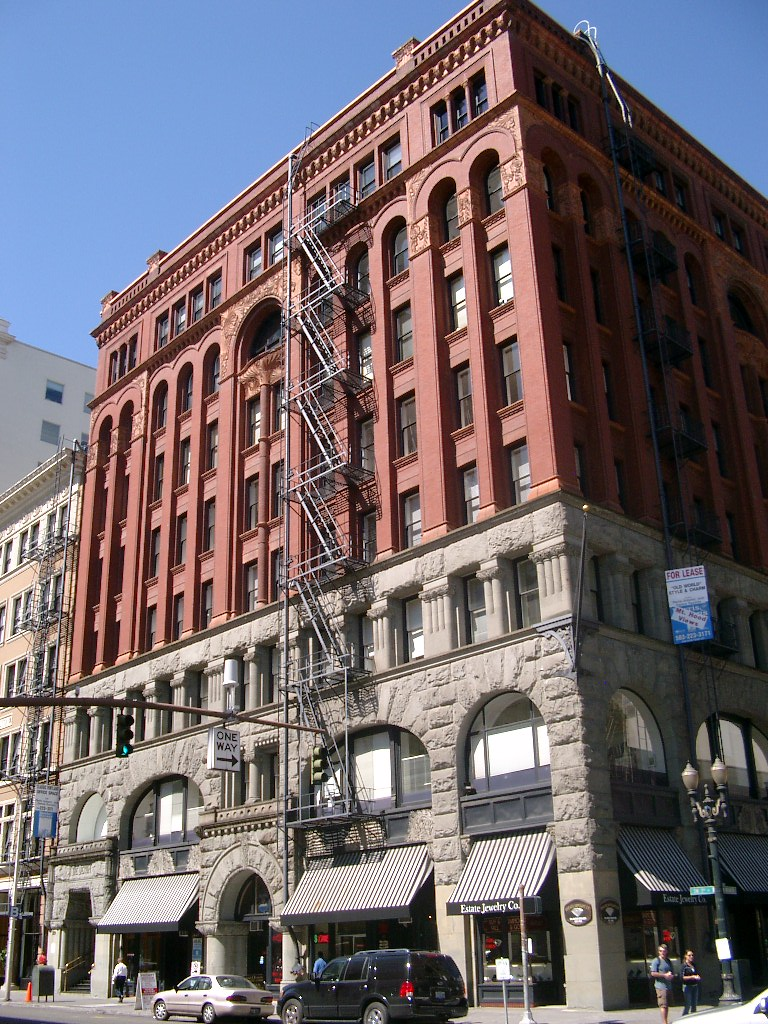
- Dekum Building, former site of Janrain's headquarters
- Founder: Larry Drebes
- Headquarters: 1233 Northwest 12th Avenue, Suite 150, Portland, Oregon, U.S.
- Revenue: $14.3 million (2014)
- Number of employees: 120 (2015)
- Parent: Akamai Technologies
- Website: Akamai Identity Cloud

Janrain, sometimes styled as JanRain, was a customer profile and identity management (CIAM) software provider based in Portland, Oregon, United States. It was established in 2002. Akamai acquired Janrain in January 2019. Janrain was a privately held company.

== History ==
Janrain was founded in Portland in 2002 by Larry Drebes. The firm's name "references a wet January in Portland", and has been described as a "leading provider of customer profile and identity management". Drebes helped create the OpenID protocol, which has been called a "decentralized authentication method for the new Web". Janrain was a founding member of the OpenID Foundation and has advocated for OpenID.

In December 2009, Janrain raised US$3.25 million from American venture capital firms DFJ Frontier, RPM Ventures, and Anthem Venture Partners. In August 2011, the company announced a $15.5 million funding round led by Emergence Capital Partners. Emergence founder Brian Jacobs joined Janrain's board of directors. That month, the company had funding totaling $18.7 million from the four venture capital firms, as well as from Timothy C. Draper and Drebes. That month, the firm received $33 million in new investment, marking one of the largest venture capital rounds for an Internet company in Oregon. Funding was led by Millennium Technology Value Partners, with additional participation by DFJ Frontier and RPM Ventures, existing investors Emergence Capital and Anthem Venture Partners, plus Epic Ventures, Salesforce.com, and Split Rock Partners. Including the 2013 investment, which was more than twice the amount of any venture investment in Oregon in 2012, Janrain had raised $52–53 million, and was noted as one of the "best-funded young technology" businesses in the state.

In February 2013, the Austin, Texas-based company Umbel announced its partnership with Janrain to combine the former company's "real-time audience insights" technology with the latter's "User Management Platform, providing actionable intelligence from rich social data, in real-time". In December 2014, Janrain acquired the startup company Arktan for an undisclosed amount. Janrain began offering data services developed by both companies, which had worked together for "several years" before the acquisition. According to Advertising Age, Janrain had grown to 160 employees; Drebes said there would be no executive changes for Arktan's five employees. Inc. reported that Janrain earned $14.3 million in revenue in 2014, had a three-year growth rate of 294%, and employed 135 people—44 more than the previous year. In 2015, the firm expanded its international reach by building a new data center in China. In September 2015, Portland Business Journal said Janrain employed "around 120, most of them in Portland", and had raised $52.8 million to date from investors. In December 2015, the company secured an additional $27 million in their Series D funding, led by HighBar Partners.

The company's headquarters are in the Dekum Building at 519 Southwest Third Avenue in downtown Portland. Janrain moved into the building in 2009, occupying the sixth floor, which it vacated and moved into three others in February 2013. According to Portland Business Journal, much of the office space's "funky" modern and Romanesque architecture existed previously, though some updates were made when the company relocated. The space has an open design with glass walls for offices, a game room, a spiral staircase connecting the two floors, and an atrium extending up to an eighth floor skylight. It also has quiet, private spaces for nursing mothers, telephone calls, or work rooms. Conference rooms on one floor are named after mountains in the Pacific Northwest, while those on another level are named for Portland's bridges. Janrain turned the basketball court on the building's fourth floor, left by the previous occupant Wieden+Kennedy, into a conference room and meeting space. Janrain is open to remote work, which the Portland Business Journal said is unique in Portland. The company has satellite offices in Frankfurt, London, and Paris.

In April 2016, Jim Kaskade joined Janrain as the new CEO.

=== Clients ===
In December 2009, TechCrunch reported that Janrain's technology was being used for the websites of EMI Music, Fox News, Kmart, Sears, and Universal Music Group. Dr Pepper Snapple Group began using Janrain's identity management services for its digital properties in 2011. Intel and MTV were also confirmed as clients in 2011. In January 2013, Avis, BBC, the British public-service television broadcaster Channel 4, Comedy Central, Financial Times Fox, Fox Networks, Mattel, NPR, the Pac-12 Conference, Philips, Samsung, and Whole Foods Market were confirmed as clients. Pfizer became a client by the end of 2014, and AMC was confirmed in September 2015.

== Technology ==
RPX, a software as a service (SaaS) platform for on-site OpenID account acceptance, has been described as Janrain's "flagship" product. More than 170,000 websites were using the solution by December 2009. According to VentureBeat, "Janrain Engage" enables social sharing, "Janrain Capture" gathers and stores profile data, and allows the sharing of profiles across websites; and "Janrain Federate" enables single sign-on for websites. In 2012, the company launched a "one-click sharing mechanism" for Facebook, giving users greater control over their sharing behaviors. Janrain's services were used by more than 350,000 websites by January 2013. TechCrunch said data collected by the company's technology from user log-ins helped clients "provide better on-site or in-app experiences for their users", and that "These experiences could include personalized offers or promotions based on user's social demographics data. Janrain User Management Platform (JUMP) provides a single, unified view of users across multiple online properties and social identities, and includes products for social login, profile data storage, registration, and single sign-on."

Janrain's "social login" technology enables websites to offer registration with profiles from Facebook, Google, LinkedIn, Twitter, and other social media sites. It uses profile data, such as a user's age, gender, interests, and location, allowing marketers to target advertising messages. According to The Oregonian's Mike Rogoway, Janrain "encourages its clients to minimize what they ask online visitors to share, at least initially, and to build trust". Janrain hired technology attorney Lewis Barr to serve as vice president for "legal and privacy matters", and to inform clients about the appropriate and legal collection of digital information.

In June 2014, the company launched "Janrain User-Generated Content" ("Janrain UGC"); according to Adweek, the service "allows brands to give their fans the ability to interact, comment on, and chat about content on their sites ... [and] allowing them to easily discover friends’ activities on those sites" and "better create personalized brand experiences". Features include comments, activity streams, live chat, social post curation, and redesigned social sharing. The firm's "Social Profile Navigator" provides users with an overview of the data they are sharing on social media sites. Arktan, which Janrain acquired in 2014, developed technology that analyzes Facebook data and enables comments, polls, reviews, and other services. Arktan had also developed social television technology and partnered with Facebook in India to generate on-air and online graphics using data from Facebook Keyword Insights API during the 2014 Indian Premier League cricket event.

=== Jyte ===
Jyte
- Website type: Social content website
- Owners: JanRain, Inc.
- Creators: Brian Ellin and Dag Rorek Arneson
- Website: http://jyte.com/ (inactive)
- Registration: Free
- Launched: January 31, 2007

Jyte was a community-based website created by JanRain in late January 2007, named as an acronym for "Just You Tell 'Em". According to the developers, Jyte allowed users to "make claims about [themselves], others, or just about anything". These "claims" consisted of a headline and, optionally, a short text body. They could also be assigned user-selected tags. A claim was presented as a declarative sentence. Site users could then vote on it by selecting whether they agree or disagree. The total number of people who have voted, as well as their votes, were displayed with the claim. Users could also leave comments on claims, with or without voting. One article described Jyte as an example of the "democracy of the internet," which "can appear to give rise to some amazing insights."

In addition, users could give each other "cred". Cred consisted of a short word or phrase, such as a tag, that applied to a user. For example, if user Bob made a valid claim about darts, user Mary might assign him "darts" cred. Receiving cred increased the recipient user's "cred score". Cred was designed to give an idea of how trustworthy a user was in a given area, as well as his or her interests.

Jyte was developed primarily with Ruby on Rails, and was interoperable with other sites by means of several APIs. It relied solely on OpenID for user authentication. The use of one's OpenID in multiple websites and environments and the creation of a non-anonymous, portable, weighted, and persistent online reputation could provide advantages to a user in future discussions in other online and off line contexts. Jyte was described as a source of arbitrary opinions.

Jyte's website is now offline. It was acquired by "AboutUs" in 2010, and sometime later wholly ceased to exist.

== Reception ==
Inc. ranked Janrain number 264, number 455, number 723, and number 1,412 in its annual "Inc. 5000 Rank" for 2012 to 2015, respectively. The magazine's "Inc. 5000 Honors" for 2015 named Janrain a "Five-Time Inc. 5000 Honoree", number 109 for top companies in Portland, and number 19 for top companies in Oregon. In January 2014, Janrain was named a winner of the CRM Watchlist 2014, which was compiled by Paul Greenberg for his ZDNet blog, "Social CRM: The Conversation". Greenberg said Janrain's submission was the best-written of the year. Janrain was ranked number 73 and number 252 on Deloitte's "Technology Fast 500" in 2014 and 2015, respectively. Deloitte listed the company's growth rates as 1,741% (2014) and 291% (2015).

== See also ==
- List of companies based in Oregon
