= List of web service specifications =

There are a variety of specifications associated with web services. These specifications are in varying degrees of maturity and are maintained or supported by various standards bodies and entities. These specifications are the basic web services framework established by first-generation standards represented by WSDL, SOAP, and UDDI. Specifications may complement, overlap, and compete with each other. Web service specifications are occasionally referred to collectively as "WS-*", though there is not a single managed set of specifications that this consistently refers to, nor a recognized owning body across them all.

== XML specification ==
- XML (eXtensible Markup Language)
- XML Namespaces
- XML Schema
- XPath
- XQuery
- XML Information Set
- XInclude
- XML Pointer

== Messaging specification ==
- SOAP (formerly known as Simple Object Access Protocol)
- SOAP-over-UDP
- SOAP Message Transmission Optimization Mechanism
- WS-Addressing
- WS-EndpointResolution
- WS-Notification
  - WS-BaseNotification
  - WS-Topics
  - WS-BrokeredNotification
- WS-Transfer
- WS-Eventing
- WS-Enumeration
- WS-MakeConnection
- WS-MessageData
- WS-MessageDelivery (see WS-Addressing § History)

== Metadata exchange specification ==
- JSON-WSP
- WS-Policy
- WS-PolicyAssertions
- WS-PolicyAttachment
- WS-Discovery
  - WS-Inspection
- WS-MetadataExchange
- Universal Description Discovery and Integration (UDDI)
- WSDL 2.0 Core
- WSDL 2.0 SOAP Binding
  - Web Services Semantics (WSDL-S)
- WS-Naming

== Security specification ==
- WS-Security
- XML Signature
- XML Encryption
- XML Key Management (XKMS)
- WS-SecureConversation
- WS-SecurityPolicy
- WS-Trust
- WS-Federation
- WS-Federation Active Requestor Profile
- WS-Federation Passive Requestor Profile
- Web Services Security Kerberos Binding
- Web Single Sign-On Interoperability Profile
- Web Single Sign-On Metadata Exchange Protocol
- Security Assertion Markup Language (SAML)
- Extensible Access Control Markup Language (XACML)

== Privacy ==
- P3P

== Reliable messaging specifications ==
- WS-ReliableMessaging
- WS-Reliability
- WS-RM Policy Assertion

== Resource specifications ==
- Web Service Data Access and Integration (WS-DAI)
- Web Services Resource Framework
  - WS-Resource
  - WS-BaseFaults
  - WS-ServiceGroup
  - WS-ResourceProperties
  - WS-ResourceLifetime
- WS-Transfer
- WS-Fragment
- Resource Representation SOAP Header Block

== Web services interoperability (WS-I) specification ==
These specifications provide additional information to improve interoperability between vendor implementations.

- WS-I Basic Profile
- WS-I Basic Security Profile
- Simple Soap Binding Profile

== Business process specifications ==
- WS-BPEL
- WS-CDL
- Web Service Choreography Interface (WSCI)
- WS-Choreography
- XML Process Definition Language
- Web Services Conversation Language (WSCL)
- Web Services Flow Language (WSFL)

== Transaction specifications ==
- WS-Agreement
- WS-AtomicTransaction
- WS-BusinessActivity
- WS-Coordination
- WS-CAF
- WS-Transaction
- WS-Context
- WS-CF
- WS-TXM

== Management specifications ==
- WS-CIM
- WS-GAF
- WS-Management
- WS-Management Catalog
- WS-ResourceTransfer
- WSDM

== Presentation-oriented specification ==
- Web Services for Remote Portlets

== Draft specifications ==
- WS-Provisioning – Describes the APIs and schemas necessary to facilitate interoperability between provisioning systems in a consistent manner using Web services

== Other ==
- Devices Profile for Web Services (DPWS)
- ebXML

== Standardization ==
- ISO/IEC 19784-2:2007 Information technology -- Biometric application programming interface -- Part 2: Biometric archive function provider interface
- ISO 19133:2005 Geographic information -- Location-based services -- Tracking and navigation
- ISO/IEC 20000-1:2005 Information technology -- Service management -- Part 1: Specification
- ISO/IEC 20000-2:2005 Information technology -- Service management -- Part 2: Code of practice
- ISO/IEC 24824-2:2006 Information technology -- Generic applications of ASN.1: Fast Web Services
- ISO/IEC 25437:2006 Information technology -- Telecommunications and information exchange between systems -- WS-Session -- Web Services for Application Session Services

== See also ==
- Web service
