= List of web service frameworks =

A list of web service frameworks:

Name	Platform	Messaging Model(Destination)	Specifications	Protocols
Apache Axis	Java/C++	Client/Server	WS-ReliableMessaging, WS-Coordination, WS-Security, WS-AtomicTransaction, WS-Addressing	SOAP, WSDL
Apache Axis2	Java	Client/Server/ Asyn Support	WS-ReliableMessaging, WS-Security, WS-AtomicTransaction, WS-Addressing, MTOM, WS-Policy, WS-MetadataExchange	SOAP1.1, SOAP1.2, MTOM, WSDL 2.0, WSDL, REST
Apache CXF	Java	Client/Server/ Asyn Support	WS-ReliableMessaging, WS-Security, WS-Addressing, MTOM, WS-Policy, WS-SecureConversation, WS-SecurityPolicy, WS-Trust	SOAP1.1, SOAP1.2, MTOM, WSDL 2.0, WSDL, REST
CodeIgniter	PHP	Client/Server	An open source MVC web application framework	XML-RPC
gSOAP	C and C++	Client/Server Duplex/Async	WS-Addressing, WS-Discovery, WS-Policy, WS-ReliableMessaging, WS-Security, WS-SecurityPolicy	SOAP1.1, SOAP1.2, MTOM, WSDL 1.1, WSDL 2.0, REST, XML-RPC, JSON, JSON-RPC, XML
Java Web Services Development Pack	Java	Client/Server	WS-Addressing, WS-Security, ???	SOAP, WSDL, ???
Jello Framework	GAE/Java	Client/Server/Asyn Support	End-to-End Java framework for Google App Engine including comprehensive Data Authorization model, a powerful RESTful engine, and out-of-the-box UI views.	REST, OData, JSON
Jersey	Java	Client/Server	Jersey is the reference implementation for the JAX-RS specification by Oracle (Originally Sun)	REST
.NET Framework	C#, VB.NET	Client/Server	WS-Addressing, WS-MetadataExchange, WS-Security, WS-Policy, WS-SecurityPolicy, WS-Trust, WS-SecureConversation, WS-ReliableMessaging, WS-Coordination, WS-AtomicTransaction	SOAP, WSDL, MTOM
Metro	Java	Client/Server	WS-Addressing, WS-ReliableMessaging, WS-Coordination, WS-AtomicTransaction, WS-Security, WS-Security Policy, WS-Trust, WS-SecureConversation, WS-Policy, WS-MetadataExchange	SOAP, WSDL, MTOM, JSON, XML
Web Services Invocation Framework	Java	Client	???	SOAP, WSDL
Windows Communication Foundation	.NET	Client/Server/Asyn support	WS-Addressing, WS-MetadataExchange, WS-Security, WS-Policy, WS-SecurityPolicy, WS-Trust, WS-SecureConversation, WS-ReliableMessaging, WS-Coordination, WS-AtomicTransaction, WS-Discovery	SOAP1.1, SOAP1.2, WSDL, XML, JSON, REST, MTOM, MSMQ, IPC, P2P, TCP, UDP, WebSocket
WSO2 WSF/PHP	PHP	Client/Server	SOAP MTOM, WS-Addressing, WS-Security, WS-SecurityPolicy, WS-Secure Conversation, WS-ReliableMessaging	SOAP, WSDL
XFire became Apache CXF	Java	Client/Server	WS-Addressing, WS-Security	SOAP, WSDL
XINS	Java	Server ?	??	SOAP, XML-RPC, WSDL, JSON-RPC, JSON
Dframe Framework	PHP	Client/Server	Web application Components helping build MVC project.	JSON, REST
Laminas (formerly Zend Framework)	PHP	Client/Server	Web application framework implemented in PHP	SOAP, JSON, JSON-RPC, REST, XML-RPC
Yii	PHP	Client/Server	Open source, object-oriented, component-based MVC	REST
Smart.Framework	PHP	Client/Server	a free, BSD licensed, open-source web framework	JSON, REST, SOAP
Symfony2	PHP	Client/Server	PHP web application framework	JSON, REST, SOAP

== See also ==
- Comparison of web frameworks
- List of web service specifications
- List of web service protocols
- Web service
- Java view technologies and frameworks
- List of application servers
