= Apache CXF =

Web services framework

- Developer: Apache Software Foundation
- Stable release: 4.2.0 / February 16, 2026; 24 days ago
- Written in: Java
- Operating system: Cross-platform
- Type: Web Services
- License: Apache License 2.0
- Website: cxf.apache.org
- Repository: CXF Repository

Apache CXF is an open source software project developing a Web services framework. It originated as the combination of Celtix developed by IONA Technologies and XFire developed by a team hosted at the now defunct host CodeHaus in 2006. These two projects were combined at the Apache Software Foundation. The name "CXF" was derived by combining "Celtix" and "XFire".

== Description ==
CXF is often used with Apache ServiceMix, Apache Camel and Apache ActiveMQ in service-oriented architecture (SOA) infrastructure projects.

Apache CXF supports the Java programming interfaces JAX-WS, JAX-RS, JBI, JCA, JMX, JMS over SOAP, Spring, and the XML data binding frameworks JAXB, Aegis, Apache XMLBeans, SDO.

CXF includes the following:

- Web Services Standards Support:
  - SOAP
  - WS-Addressing
  - WS-Policy
  - WS-ReliableMessaging
  - WS-SecureConversation
  - WS-Security
  - WS-SecurityPolicy
- JAX-WS API for Web service development
  - Java-first support
  - WSDL-first tooling
- JAX-RS (JSR 339 2.0) API for RESTful Web service development
- JavaScript programming model for service and client development
- Maven tooling
- CORBA support
- HTTP, JMS and WebSocket transport layers
- Embeddable Deployment:
  - ServiceMix or other JBI containers
  - Geronimo or other Java EE containers
  - Tomcat or other servlet containers
  - OSGi
- Reference OSGi Remote Services implementation

IONA Technologies distributes a commercial Enterprise version of Apache CXF under the name FUSE Services Framework.

== See also ==
- The Axis Web Services framework
- Apache Wink, a project in incubation with JAX-RS support
- List of web service frameworks
