= WS-CAF =

Web Services Composite Application Framework (WS-CAF) is an open framework developed by OASIS. Its purpose is to define a generic and open framework for applications that contain multiple services used together, which are sometimes referred to as composite applications. WS-CAF characteristics include interoperability, ease of implementation and ease of use.

== Scope ==
The scope of WS-CAF includes:

- Provision of WSDL definitions for context, coordination and transactions.
- Message formats will be specified as SOAP headers and/or body content.
- The specification is to be programming language-neutral and platform-neutral.
- Demonstrated composability with other Web Service specifications that are being developed as open, recognized standards
- The goals of promoting convergence, consistent use, and a coherent architecture.
- Support composability as a critical architectural characteristic of Web service specifications. WS-CAF and WS-Context are targeted to become building blocks for other Web service specifications and standards.

== Input specifications ==
The WS-CAF accepts the following Web services specifications as input:

- WS-Context: its purpose is to provide a means to reference a shared context, which relates a set of interactions between web services (termed an activity). This context provides details of the application-specific execution environment for these services, and is typically included in the header of SOAP message. Contexts may be passed by value, or by reference, in which case they are retrieved using a Context Manager service. A Context Service is described, which allows management of activities by means of the begin and complete operations, which create and destroy the context respectively.
- WS-Coordination Framework (WS-CF)
- WS-Transaction Management (WS-TXM)

== Benefits ==
The benefits and results of CAF are intended to be standard and interoperable ways to:

- Demarcate and coordinate web service activities
- Propagate and coordinate context information
- Notify participants of changes in an activity
- Define the relationship of coordinators to each other
- Recover transactions predictably and consistently in a business process execution.
- Interact across multiple transaction models (such as are used in CORBA, CICS, Enterprise JavaBeans or .NET environments).

== See also ==
- WS-Coordination - an alternative transaction standard
- Enterprise service bus
