= Windows Rally =

Windows Rally is a set of technologies from Microsoft intended to simplify the setup and maintenance of wired and wireless network-connected devices. They aim to increase reliability and security of connectivity for users who connect the devices to the Internet or to computers running Microsoft Windows. These technologies provide control of network quality of service (QoS) and diagnostics for data sharing, communications, and entertainment. Windows Rally technologies provide provisioning for the following devices:

- Wireless access points, PCs, and servers
- Network printers, projectors, printer bridges, digital still cameras, and game consoles
- Digital media receivers, network media players, set-top boxes, digital photo frames, and PDAs

== Windows Rally technologies ==
Architecture of the Windows Rally stack

Windows Rally includes the following set of technologies:

=== LLTD ===
The Link Layer Topology Discovery (LLTD) protocol enables applications to discover devices and determine network topology. In Windows Vista, it enables a graphical view of all the devices in the network on the Network Map. For Windows XP computers to appear on the Network Map, the |url-status=dead LLTD Responder must be downloaded and installed. Devices that provide audio or video playback or that are bandwidth sensitive can implement the QoS Extension part of the protocol so that they receive prioritized streams and that changes in available bandwidth have less impact on the playback experience.

=== qWAVE ===
Windows Vista includes qWAVE, a pre-configured quality of service API for time-dependent multimedia data, such as audio or video streams. qWAVE uses different packet priority schemes for real-time flows (such as multimedia packets) and best-effort flows (such as file downloads or e-mails) to ensure that real-time data gets delayed as little as possible, while providing a high-quality channel for other data packets. qWAVE-enabled applications together with devices that implement the LLTD QoS Extensions aim to improve an end user's experience of streaming video by prioritizing traffic and reducing the effects of network-related transient issues.

=== Windows Connect Now ===
Windows Connect Now (WCN) is the name of Windows Rally technologies aimed for simpler wireless device configuration. With Windows Connect Now, users running Windows Vista or Windows XP SP2 can create network configuration settings and transmit them to the access point. Alternatively, users can also print the configuration settings for reference for manually configuring the device. With Windows Connect Now, one of the following methods may be used for easier configuration:

- WCN-NET is Microsoft's implementation of the Wi-Fi Simple Config standard. It provides for configuration of devices using out-of-band Ethernet and in-band wireless networks. In Windows Vista, WCN-NET can discover an unconfigured router, access point, base station or a device such as a Media Center Extender by using UPnP, authenticate with the device by using a personal identification number (PIN), provide wireless settings that are based on user selection and set up a wireless network over a wired Ethernet connection. Windows XP and earlier Windows versions do not support WCN-NET.
- WCN-UFD uses an API and an XML format that works with a wizard to write configuration files to a USB Flash Drive for more secure wireless networks. Windows XP Service Pack 2 and later Windows operating systems supports WCN-UFD.
- WCN-MTP includes a Media Transfer Protocol (MTP) extension that enables an MTP initiator to provide an MTP responder with configuration parameters for joining a wireless network and supports more secure configuration of MTP-capable devices on wireless networks. In Windows Vista, a temporary USB cable connection can be used for MTP-class devices such as portable media, digital cameras etc.

=== Devices Profile for Web Services ===
The Devices Profile for Web Services (DPWS) standard defines a minimal set of implementation constraints to enable secure web service messaging, discovery, description, and eventing on resource-constrained devices. DPWS describes a set of requirements that enable a device to be discovered by clients and describe available services to those clients. DPWS is similar Universal Plug and Play (UPnP) but, it is fully aligned with Web Services technology, supports standards for device connectivity such as WS-Discovery and WS-Eventing and includes numerous extension points allowing for integration of device-provided services in enterprise-wide application scenarios and roaming devices that work across the Internet.

In Windows Vista, Web Services for Devices (WSDAPI) is an unmanaged code implementation of the Devices Profile for Web Services (DPWS) standard. The Windows Communication Foundation (WCF) executes managed code and offers enterprise-level services for Web Services solutions on Windows XP and Windows Vista.

==== Function Discovery ====
To support Simple Service Discovery Protocol (SSDP) and WS-Discovery, and for extensible discovery to support other protocols, Windows Vista includes the Function Discovery API. Function Discovery serves as an abstraction layer between applications and devices, allowing applications to discover devices by referencing the device's function, rather than by its bus type or the nature of its connection. The Function Discovery API aims to create applications that enumerate system resources, use devices of a specific type and discover and manage lists of devices or objects, which are sorted by functionality or class, whether local or network connected. Function Discovery supports an extensible discovery provider model. Vendors can also create a custom provider to expose resources through Function Discovery.

=== Plug and Play Extensions (PnP-X) ===
PnP-X uses SSDP and WS-Discovery network communication protocols to make network-connected devices as discoverable as those that are connected directly to a computer over a bus such as Universal Serial Bus (USB). The device manufacturer implements PnP-X capabilities to supplement either UPnP or Web Services for Devices (WSD) enabled devices. As a result, for end users, the device is relatively as easy to install as traditional Plug and Play devices. An association database service using this protocol was introduced in Windows 8 under the name Device Association Framework.

=== Universal Plug and Play ===
Universal Plug and Play (UPnP) is an IP-based protocol suite based on preliminary versions of Web Services protocols such as XML and Simple Object Access Protocol (SOAP). With UPnP, a device can dynamically join a network, obtain an IP address, convey its capability, and discover the presence and capabilities of other devices on the network. Information about the set of services that a particular device type can provide is captured in an XML device description document that the device hosts. The device description also lists properties such as device name and icons associated with the device. UPnP has been adopted widely for devices that interact in home network audio-video scenarios.

UPnP is supported by Windows Me, Windows XP and Windows Vista. In Windows Vista, UPnP is integrated with PnP-X and Function Discovery.

== See also ==
- Windows Vista networking technologies
- Web service
- Windows Communication Foundation
