= WS-DAI =

Web Service Data Access and Integration (WS-DAI) is a suite of web service specifications developed by the Open Grid Forum which define SOAP and WSDL-based interfaces for access to data resources, such as relational databases. The WS-DAI framework is designed to complement other parts of the Open Grid Services Architecture (OGSA) for the purpose of facilitating an interoperable service-oriented grid computing architecture.

The WS-DAI core specification is agnostic with respect to the underlying data model employed by a data resource. To this end, the OGF defined concrete "realizations" of WS-DAI tied to specific data models. These are:

- WS-DAIR, for relational databases,
- WS-DAIX, for XML databases, and
- WS-DAI RDF(S), for RDF stores.

WS-DAI can also be extended to support further realizations such as for object databases or data mining.

== See also ==
- List of web service specifications
