= WS-MetadataExchange =

WS-MetaDataExchange is a web services protocol specification, published by BEA Systems, IBM, Microsoft, and SAP. WS-MetaDataExchange is part of the WS-Federation roadmap; and is designed to work in conjunction with WS-Addressing, WSDL and WS-Policy to allow retrieval of metadata about a Web Services endpoint.

It uses a SOAP message to request metadata, and so goes beyond the basic technique of appending "?wsdl" to a service name's URL

== See also ==
- List of web service specifications
- Web services
