= WS-Federation Passive Requestor Profile =

Web Services specification

WS-Federation Passive Requestor Profile is a Web Services specification – intended to work with the WS-Federation specification – which defines how identity, authentication and authorization mechanisms work across trust realms. The specification deals specifically with how applications, such as web browsers, make requests using these mechanisms. In this context, the web-browser is known as a "passive requestor." By way of contrast, WS-Federation Active Requestor Profile deals with "active requestors" such as SOAP-enabled applications. WS-Federation Passive Requestor Profile was created by IBM, BEA Systems, Microsoft, VeriSign, and RSA Security.

== See also ==
- List of Web service specifications
