= WSIL =

WSIL may refer to:

- WSIL-TV, a television station based in Harrisburg, Illinois.
- Web Services in Learning (WSIL), a forum for vendors in the eLearning space to jointly propose/develop a library of standard web services.
- Web Services Inspection Language, a specification for discovery of web services
