= Windows Communication Foundation =

Software framework

Windows Communication Foundation (WCF)
- Original author: Microsoft
- Developer: .NET Foundation
- Release: November 21, 2006; 19 years ago
- Stable release: v10.1.0 / October 20, 2026; 9 days ago
- Written in: C#
- Operating system: Linux, macOS, Windows
- Platform: .NET Framework, .NET
- Predecessor: Web Services Enhancements
- Type: Software framework
- License: MIT License
- Website: docs.microsoft.com/en-us/dotnet/framework/wcf/index
- Repository: github.com/dotnet/wcf

The Windows Communication Foundation (WCF), previously known as Indigo, is a free and open-source runtime and a set of APIs in the .NET Framework for building connected, service-oriented applications.

.NET Core 1.0, released 2016, did not support WCF server side code. WCF support was added to the platform with support for .NET Core 3.1, .NET 5, and .NET 6 in 2022.

== The architecture ==
This subsystem is a part of .NET Framework 3.0

WCF is a tool often used to implement and deploy a service-oriented architecture (SOA). It is designed using service-oriented architecture principles to support distributed computing where services have remote consumers. Clients can consume multiple services; services can be consumed by multiple clients. Services are loosely coupled to each other. Services typically have a WSDL interface (Web Services Description Language) that any WCF client can use to consume the service, regardless of which platform the service is hosted on. WCF implements many advanced Web services (WS) standards such as WS-Addressing, WS-ReliableMessaging and WS-Security. With the release of .NET Framework 4.0, WCF also provides RSS Syndication Services, WS-Discovery, routing and better support for REST services.

=== Endpoints ===
A WCF client connects to a WCF service via an endpoint. Each service exposes its contract via one or more endpoints. An endpoint has an address (which is a URL specifying where the endpoint can be accessed) and binding properties that specify how the data will be transferred.

The mnemonic "ABC" can be used to remember address/binding/contract. Binding specifies what communication protocols are used to access the service, whether security mechanisms are to be used, and the like. WCF includes predefined bindings for most common communication protocols such as SOAP over HTTP, SOAP over TCP, and SOAP over Message Queues, etc. Interaction between WCF endpoint and client is done using a SOAP envelope. SOAP envelopes are in simple XML form, which makes WCF platform-independent. When a client wants to access the service via an endpoint, it not only needs to know the contract, but it also has to adhere to the binding specified by the endpoint. Thus, both client and server must have compatible endpoints.

With the release of the .NET Framework 3.5 in November 2007, Microsoft released an encoder that added support for the JSON serialization format to WCF.

=== Behaviors ===
Behaviors are types that modify or extend service or client functionality. Behaviors allow the developer to create custom processing, transformation, or inspection that is applied to messages as they are sent or received. Some examples of uses for behaviors are:

- Controlling whether metadata is published with a service.
- Adding security features to a service, such as impersonation, authorization, or managing tokens
- Recording information about messages, such as tracking, tracing, or logging
- Message or parameter validation
- Invoking all additional operations when messages are received—such as notifying users when certain messages arrive

Behaviors implement the IServiceBehavior interface for service extensions, the IEndpointBehavior for endpoints, the IContractBehavior interface for service contracts, or the IOperationBehavior for operations. Service behaviors are used for message processing across a service, rather than processing that would be specific to a single operation.

== Interoperability ==
WCF supports interoperability with WCF applications running on the same Windows machine or WCF running on a different Windows machines or standard Web services built on platforms such as Java running on Windows or other operating systems. In addition to SOAP, WCF 4 supports non-SOAP XML, RSS, JSON, and binary formats for external communication via HTTP or HTTPS.

== See also ==
- Web Services Enhancements
- Service Component Architecture (SCA) and Service Data Objects (SDO), which are alternatives to WCF in the Java world standardized by OASIS.
- WCF Data Services
