= ID-WSF =

Identity Web Services Framework (ID-WSF) is a protocol stack that profiles WS-Security, WS-Addressing, SAML and adds new protocol specifications of its own, such as the Discovery Service, for open market per user service discovery, and the People Service for delegation and social networking.

== Development ==
The ID-WSF stack was developed by the Liberty Alliance. The first release, ID-WSF 1.0 (and subsequent 1.1 and 1.2) were released in 2003. ID-WSF1 was interoperability tested among several vendor implementations, which received certification from the Liberty Alliance.

However, the first version of ID-WSF was not widely adopted. Perhaps the only significant adoption was by France Telecom and the French government's Mon Service Public. Some adoption happened in Japan as well. Liberty Alliance proceeded to create an improved version, the ID-WSF 2.0 in 2006, which included harmonization with certain WS-* technologies, such as WS-Addressing and WS-Security. These changes were vigorously, and successfully, lobbied by Conor Cahill of AOL (at the time). ID-WSF 2.0 interoperability certification was participated by several major league vendors, as well as by startups and open source projects.

Since then, ID-WSF 2.0 has become the only widely accepted interoperable profile of WS-* technologies. Its strength is essentially in narrow focus where tight enough profile for interoperability was specified. ID-WSF 2.0 interoperability certification by Liberty Alliance was accomplished by several vendors, including some open source.

ID-WSF 2.0 has been adopted as standards base by the Finnish e-government project and by the European Commission FP7 project TAS3.

== List of Implementations of ID-WSF ==
- Sun Microsystems
- Trustgenix
- NEC
- NTT
- Symlabs SFIS
- ZXID.org - the reference implementation of TAS3 - Trusted Architecture for Securely Shareable Services, with Privacy
- Lasso, C library, bindings in Python, Java, Perl and PHP, GNU GPL Licence, developed by Entr'ouvert
