= MTOM =

MTOM may refer to:

- Maximum takeoff mass, also known as maximum takeoff weight
- Message Transmission Optimization Mechanism
