= Web Services Semantics =

Web Services Semantics (WSDL-S) is a proposed extension to the WSDL standard. WSDL-S extends standard WSDL to include semantic elements which should improve the reusability of web services by facilitating the composition of services, improving discovery, and enabling the integration of legacy software with a Web Services framework. WSDL-S was developed by IBM and the University of Georgia.

== See also ==
- List of web service specifications
