= SDEP =

Web service specification

Street events Data Exchange Protocol
- Filename extension: .sdep or .xml
- Internet media type: text/xml
- Uniform Type Identifier (UTI): public.xml
- Developed by: Elgin
- Initial release: 7 April 2006
- Latest release: 5 May 2010; 15 years ago
- Type of format: Markup language, data exchange, Geographic Information System
- Extended from: SGML, XML, SOAP, GML, NLPG
- Standard: http://interim.cabinetoffice.gov.uk
- Open format?: yes
- Website: http://www.elgin.org.uk or

The SDEP (Street events Data Exchange Protocol) comprises an XML data schema and web service WSDL for exchanging information about streetworks, roadworks, and street events between systems.

Elgin was funded by the UK NeSDS Government e-Standards Programme to conduct a consultation and convene meetings to define the requirements of a common data exchange protocol for streetworks registers and other systems handling street events' data. SDEP was developed to allow the open exchange of such data between back office systems used by local authorities to manage their highway networks, in order to enable e-Government and streetworks co-ordination.

The SDEP consultation group comprised ELGIN (chair), Mayrise Ltd., Symology Ltd., Pitney Bowes Inc., Exor Corporation (Bentley Systems), Office of the Deputy Prime Minister and Transport for London, with the National Traffic Control Centre in an observing capacity.

== See also ==
- Office of the Deputy Prime Minister
- Transport for London
- National Traffic Control Centre
