= WS-Transaction =

WS-Transaction is a web services specification developed by BEA Systems, IBM, and Microsoft. The WS-Transaction specification describes coordination types that are used with the extensible coordination framework described in the WS-Coordination specification. It defines two coordination types: Atomic Transaction (AT) for individual operations, and Business Activity (BA) for long running transactions. Developers can use either or both of these coordination types when building applications that require consistent agreement on the outcome of distributed activities.
