= WS-Federation Active Requestor Profile =

WS-Federation Active Requestor Profile is a Web Services specification - intended to work with the WS-Federation specification - which defines how identity, authentication and authorization mechanisms work across trust realms. The specification deals specifically with how applications, such as SOAP-enabled applications, make requests using these mechanisms. By contrast, the WS-Federation Passive Requestor Profile deals with "passive requestors" such as web-browsers. WS-Federation Active Requestor Profile was created by IBM, BEA Systems, Microsoft, VeriSign, and RSA Security.

== See also ==
- List of Web service specifications
