= Web Services Security Kerberos Binding =

Web Services specification

Web Services Security Kerberos Binding is a Web Services specification, authored by IBM and Microsoft, which details how to integrate the Kerberos authentication mechanism with the Web Services Security model. The most recent draft of the specification was released in 2003 and is identified as being for "review and evaluation only."

== See also ==
- List of Web service specifications
- WS-Federation
