= XOP =

XOP may refer to:

- XML-binary Optimized Packaging, a W3C recommendation for embedding binary data in XML
- XOP instruction set, a computer instruction set introduced by AMD in 2009
