= Web Single Sign-On Metadata Exchange Protocol =

Web Single Sign-On Metadata Exchange Protocol is a Web Services and Federated identity specification, published by Microsoft and Sun Microsystems that defines mechanisms for a service to query an identity provider for metadata concerning the protocol suites it supports. The goal of this operation is to increase the ability of a given service to interoperate with a given identity provider.

== See also ==
- List of Web service specifications
- Web Single Sign-On Interoperability Profile
- SAML
- XACML
- OpenID
- WS-Federation
