= Web Single Sign-On Interoperability Profile =

Web Single Sign-On Interoperability Profile is a Web Services and Federated identity specification, published by Microsoft and Sun Microsystems that defines interoperability between WS-Federation and the Liberty Alliance protocols.

== See also ==
- List of Web service specifications
- Web Single Sign-On Metadata Exchange Protocol
- SAML
- XACML
- OpenID
- WS-Federation
