= ZXID =

Identity management toolkit

- Release: August 1, 2005
- Stable release: Release 1.03 / August 12, 2011
- Written in: C/C++, Java, CSharp, PHP, Perl, others per SWIG
- Operating system: Cross-platform
- Available in: English
- Type: Identity and access management
- License: Apache License, Version 2.0
- Website: http://zxid.org/

ZXID.org Identity Management toolkit implements standalone SAML 2.0, Liberty ID-WSF 2.0, and XACML 2.0 stacks and aims at implementing all popular federation, SSO, and ID Web Services protocols. It is a C implementation with minimal external dependencies - OpenSSL, CURL, and zlib – ensuring easy deployment (no DLL hell). Due to its small footprint and efficient and accurate schema driven implementation, it is suitable for embedded and high volume applications. Language bindings to all popular highlevel languages such as PHP, Perl, and Java, are provided via SWIG. ZXID implements, as of Nov 2011, SP, IdP, WSC, WSP, Discovery, PEP, and PDP roles. ZXID is the reference implementation of the core security architecture of the TAS3.eu project.

== Research and projects ==
TAS3 architecture, and ZXID as a reference implementation, has been used by various research efforts.

ZXID.org has been deployed commercially by various enterprise customers in US (e.g. Symlabs Inc., LightSquared, etc.), Europe (Synergetics NV, Levelview Lda, zxidp.org, etc.), and Asia (e.g. Sri Lanka Hotels & Resorts).

== IPR status ==
Apache2 Open Source License. All dependency libraries (OpenSSL, libcurl, zlib) are under similarly liberal open source license.

The underlying standards are all Royalty Free as specified in Liberty Alliance and OASIS IPR policies. The TAS3 architecture, of which ZXID is the reference implementation, is covered by TAS3 Consortium "Royalty free to implement and use" pledge at www.tas3.eu section "Install and configure"

In TAS3 General Assembly of 2010-09-13, following declaration was made:

"TAS3 architecture and specifications, as described in public deliverables D2.1, D2.4, and D7.1, are licensed free for implementation and use by anyone. Up to June 2010, TAS3 consortium partners do not hold patents nor will exercise patents that cover implementation and use of the TAS3 architecture and specifications of those deliverables. This license is only granted for the specific purpose of correct implementations of TAS3 specifications."

== History ==
ZXID was started in 2005 by Sampo Kellomäki while still working with Symlabs. In 2006 Sampo obtained a commitment from Symlabs to release the code under the Apache2 license, which effectively made ZXID an open source project. In 2009 the TAS3 project adopted ZXID as the reference implementation of TAS3 core security technologies. The 1.0 release and end of initial development phase happened in May 2011. ZXID is considered to be stable with respect to SAML2, ID-WSF2, and XACML2 features. ZXID continues to be an active open source project (as of October 2014) and new features, some of which may not be stable, continue to be added.
