= WS-Policy4MASC =

WS-Policy4MASC is a policy language for managing Web services and their composition.

== Overview ==
WS-Policy4MASC extends a widely used industrial standard, WS-Policy, with information necessary for run-time management, including the unique support for autonomic business-driven IT management (BDIM). The specifications of diverse financial and non-financial business value metrics and business strategies that guide business-value driven selection among alternative control (adaptation) actions are the main distinctive characteristics and contributions of WS-Policy4MASC. WS-Policy4MASC also supports other management aspects, such as fault management and maximization of technical QoS metrics. It has built-in constructs for specification of a wide range of adaptations and events common in management of service-oriented systems and business processes they implement.
