= WS-Reliability =

WS-Reliability was a SOAP-based OASIS specification that fulfills reliable messaging requirements critical to some applications of Web Services. WS-Reliability was superseded by WS-ReliableMessaging.

SOAP over HTTP is not sufficient when an application-level messaging protocol must also guarantee some level of reliability and security. This specification defines reliability in the context of current Web Services standards. This specification has been designed for use in combination with other complementary protocols and builds on previous experiences (e.g., ebXML Message Service).

== See also ==
- WS-ReliableMessaging
