= Composite application =

In computing, a composite application is a software application built by combining multiple existing functions into a new application. The technical concept can be compared to mashups. However, composite applications use business sources (e.g., existing modules or even Web services ) of information, while mashups usually rely on web-based, and often free, sources.

It is wrong to assume that composite applications are by definition part of a service-oriented architecture (SOA). Composite applications can be built using any technology or architecture.

A composite application consists of functionality drawn from several different sources. The components may be individual selected functions from within other applications, or entire systems whose outputs have been packaged as business functions, modules, or web services.

Composite applications often incorporate orchestration of "local" application logic to control how the composed functions interact with each other to produce the new, derived functionality. For composite applications that are based on SOA, WS-CAF is a Web services standard for composite applications.

== See also ==
- Web 2.0
- Composite Application Service Assembly (CASA)
- Enterprise service bus (ESB)
- Service-oriented architecture (SOA)
- Service component architecture (SCA)
- Mashup (web application hybrid)
