= Web Services Inspection Language =

WS-Inspection is a Web service specification for "discovery documents" developed in a joint effort by Microsoft and IBM. WS-Inspection lists groups of web services and their endpoints in an XML format. Currently, other standards are being used for this purpose, such as Microsoft's DISCO. It is expected that WS-Inspection will eventually replace these standards to become the universally accepted discovery standard for web services.

== See also ==
- Web Services Discovery
- List of Web service specifications
- UDDI
