= IMB =

IMB is a three-letter abbreviation that may refer to:

== Organizations ==
- IMB Bank, an Australian banking institution
- IMB Financial Services, a South African banking services institution
- Indymac Bancorp, former NYSE symbol
- Institute of Molecular Biology in Mainz, Germany
- The International Maritime Bureau of the International Chamber of Commerce
- The International Mission Board of the Southern Baptist Convention

== Other ==
- Independent Monitoring Board, of the conditions of prisoners in English jails
- Integrated Media Block in digital cinema
- Integrated Mobile Broadcast of TV over mobile telephony
- Intelligent Mail Barcode, a barcode used on mail in the United States
- Intermenstrual bleeding, uterine bleeding between the expected menstrual periods
- Internal Market Bill, United Kingdom, proposals for trading mechanisms within the UK
- The Irvine-Michigan-Brookhaven detector, of neutrinos, Ohio, US
