= SOAP-over-UDP =

SOAP-over-UDP is an OASIS standard covering the publication of SOAP messages over UDP transport protocol, providing for One-Way and Request-Response message patterns.
