= WS-Coordination =

WS-Coordination is a Web Services specification developed by BEA Systems, IBM, and Microsoft and accepted by OASIS Web Services Transaction TC in its 1.2 version. It describes an extensible framework for providing protocols that coordinate the actions of distributed applications. Such coordination protocols are used to support a number of applications, including those that need to reach consistent agreement on the outcome of distributed transactions.

The framework defined in this specification enables an application service to create a context needed to propagate an activity to other services and to register for coordination protocols. The framework enables existing transaction processing, workflow, and other systems for coordination to hide their proprietary protocols and to operate in a heterogeneous environment.

Additionally, WS-Coordination describes a definition of the structure of context and the requirements for propagating context between cooperating services.

However, this specification isn't enough to coordinate transactions among web services. It only provides a coordination framework, and other specifications like WS-Atomic Transaction or WS-BusinessActivity are needed for this purpose.

== See also ==
- WS-CAF - an alternative transaction standard.
- Enterprise service bus
