= WS-Atomic Transaction =

Structured Information Standard

Web Service Atomic Transaction (WS-AtomicTransaction or WS-AT) is an OASIS specification for coordinating distributed transactions among web services, enabling a group of services to complete a transaction with all-or-nothing (atomic) semantics. The specification defines three coordination protocols; the Completion protocol, the Volatile Two-phase commit protocol, and the Durable Two-Phase Commit protocol, which together support the coordinated commit or rollback of participating services.

Operating in conjunction with the WS-Coordination framework, which provides mechanisms for creating and propagating coordination contexts and registering participants. In a typical transaction, an application initiates a managed transaction, executed by one or more participant services, collectively providing transaction behavior similar to the atomic commit model used in traditional ACID transactions.

== See also ==
- WS-BPEL
- WS-CDL
- Web Service
- WS-Coordination
