= WS-Federation =

Identity Federation specification

WS-Federation (Web Services Federation) is an Identity Federation specification, developed by a group of companies: BEA Systems, BMC Software, CA Inc. (along with Layer 7 Technologies now a part of CA Inc.), IBM, Microsoft, Novell, Hewlett Packard Enterprise, and VeriSign. Part of the larger Web Services Security framework, WS-Federation defines mechanisms for allowing different security realms to broker information on identities, identity attributes and authentication.

== Associated specifications ==
The following draft specifications are associated with WS-Security:

- WS-SecureConversation
- WS-Federation
- WS-Authorization
- WS-Policy
- WS-Trust
- WS-Privacy

== See also ==
- List of Web service specifications
- Web Services
- SAML
- XACML
- Liberty Alliance
- OpenID
