= WS-Trust =

WS-Trust is a WS-* specification and OASIS standard that provides extensions to WS-Security, specifically dealing with the issuing, renewing, and validating of security tokens, as well as with ways to establish, assess the presence of, and broker trust relationships between participants in a secure message exchange.

The WS-Trust specification was authored by representatives of a number of companies, and was approved by OASIS as a standard in March 2007.

Using the extensions defined in WS-Trust, applications can engage in secure communication designed to work within the Web services framework.

== Overview ==
WS-Trust defines a number of new elements, concepts and artifacts in support of that goal, including:

- the concept of a Security Token Service (STS) - a web service that issues security tokens as defined in the WS-Security specification;
- the formats of the messages used to request security tokens and the responses to those messages;
- mechanisms for key exchange.

WS-Trust is then implemented within Web services libraries, provided by vendors or by open source collaborative efforts. Web services frameworks that implement the WS-Trust protocols for token request include: Microsoft's Windows Communication Foundation (WCF) and Windows Identity Foundation (WIF - as of .NET 4.5, WIF is integrated into .NET Core), Sun's WSIT framework, Apache's Rampart (part of axis2), and others. In addition, vendors or other groups may deliver products that act as a Security Token Service, or STS. Microsoft's Access Control Services is one such service, available online today. PingIdentity Corporation also markets an STS. Microsoft's ADFS also provides implementation of an STS.

== Authors ==
The companies involved in defining WS-Trust were:

- Actional Corporation, BEA Systems, Inc.
- Computer Associates International, Inc.
- International Business Machines Corporation
- Layer 7 Technologies
- Microsoft Corporation
- Oblix Inc.
- OpenNetwork Technologies Inc.
- Ping Identity Corporation
- Reactivity Inc.
- RSA Security Inc.
- VeriSign Inc

== See also ==
- WS-Security
- WS-* Web Service Specifications
- Web Services
- OASIS (organization)
- Security Tokens
- Security Token Service (STS)
- Identity management
