= List of LDAP software =

The following is a list of software programs that can communicate with and/or host directory services via the Lightweight Directory Access Protocol (LDAP).

== Server software ==
Product	Vendor	Software license (Note: Licenses here are a summary, and are not to be a full list of terms. Some packages may use libraries under different licenses.)	Initial Release	Last Release	Last Version	Comments
389 Directory Server	Red Hat	GPL linking exception with exception to allow linking to non-GPL	2005, Dec,	2024, May 15	3.1.0	Formerly Fedora Directory Server
Microsoft Entra ID	Microsoft	Proprietary	2008, Oct 27	2025	?	Known as Azure Active Directory (AAD) as well
Red Hat Identity Manager (IdM)	Red Hat	Proprietary	2008, Apr 1	2024	4.12	Fork of FreeIPA. Based on (RHEL 9.10
Active Directory	Microsoft	Proprietary	2000	2024, Nov 1	91 (WS 2025)	Integrated on Windows Server
Authorized Entities Directory (Æ-DIR)	Michael Ströder	Apache 2.0				Based on OpenLDAP with additional tools
Apache Directory Server	Apache Software Foundation	Apache 2.0	2006, Oct	2023, Oct 23	2.0.0-AM27	
Apple Open Directory -	Apple Inc.	Proprietary				A fork of the OpenLDAP project
CA Directory	CA Technologies	Proprietary		2024, Dec 2	14.1	CA Tech was acquired by Broadcom Inc in 2018
Directory services -	ForgeRock	Proprietary				A fork of the OpenDJ project
DirX Directory	Atos (ex-Siemens)					
FreeIPA	GNU	GPL	2008, Apr 1	2024, June 10	4.12.1	Using 389 Directory Server
IBM Tivoli Directory Server	IBM	Proprietary		2024, Oct 7	7.5	
Mandriva Directory Server	Mandriva development team	GPL	2011	2021, Nov 23		Now part of Mandriva Management Console
Meerkat DSA	Wildboar Software	MIT				Also supports the full X.500 directory protocols: DAP, DSP, and DOP
Nexor Directory						
NetIQ eDirectory	NetIQ	Proprietary	1993	2023, May 31	9.2.8	Successor. Originally known as Novell Directory Services (NDS). Successr of eDirectory and NDS.
OpenDJ	Open Identity Platform Community	CDDL	2010, Dec 21	2024, May 7	4.6.3	A fork of the OpenDS project developed by ForgeRock, until 2016, now maintained by OpenDJ Community
OpenDS	Sun Microsystems	CDDL		2024, May 7	4.6.3	CDDL-licensed product no longer maintained, now Oracle Unified Directory.
OpenLDAP	Kurt Zeilenga and others (based on Slapd)	OpenLDAP Public License	1998, Aug 26	2024, Nov 26	2.6.9	LDAP clone from University of Michigan
Oracle Directory Server Enterprise Edition	Oracle, based on Sun DSEE	Proprietary				11g
Oracle Internet Directory	Oracle	Proprietary		2023, Jan	12.2.1.4	
Oracle Unified Directory (OUD)	Oracle, based on OpenDS	Proprietary		2024, Apr	12.2.1.4	Based on OpenDJ
Red Hat Directory Server	Red Hat	GPL plus exception		2024, May 15	3.1.0	Commercial version of 389 Directory Server
Samba4	Samba Team	GPLv3	1992, Jan	2025, Jan 6	4.21.3	Active Directory compatible Domain Controller
Slapd	University of Michigan	Free	1993	1996		Standalone LDAP Daemon. Superseded by OpenLDAP
Sun Java System Directory Server	Sun Microsystems		2011	2011		No longer maintained

== Server software (Env + Auth + Access) ==
Name	Environment			Interface		Authentication								
Name	Heterogenous	Agnostic	AD	GUI	CLI	IAM	SSO	MFA	NTLM	KDC	SA[S,M]L	OAuth	OIDC	FS
Active Directory	No	No	Yes	Yes	Yes	Yes	Yes	Yes	Yes	Yes	Yes	Yes	Yes	Yes
Apache Directory Server	?	Yes	No	Yes	Yes	No	Yes	Yes	No	Yes	Yes	Yes	Yes	Yes
Red Hat Directory Server	No	No	Yes	Yes	Yes	Yes	Yes	Yes	No	Yes	Yes	Yes	Yes	Yes
FreeIPA	No	No	Yes	Yes	Yes	Yes	Yes	Yes	No	Yes	Yes	Yes	Yes	Yes
OpenLDAP	Yes	Yes	No	Yes	Yes	Yes	Yes	No	No	No	Yes	No	No	Yes
Microsoft Entra ID	No	No	Yes	Yes	Yes	Yes	Yes	Yes	Yes	Yes	Yes	Yes	Yes	Yes

- FS: Federation Services

== Server software (Features) ==
Name	Features													
Name	Replication	GPO	LDIF	PKI	LDAP	NTP	DNS	DHCP	POP3	IMAP	SMB	CIFS	BRS	DRS
Active Directory	Yes	Yes	Yes	Yes	Yes	Yes	Yes	Yes	Yes	Yes	Yes	Yes	Yes	Yes
Apache Directory Server	Yes	No	Yes	Yes	Yes	Yes	No	No	No	No	No	No	Yes	Yes
Red Hat Directory Server	Yes	No	Yes	Yes	Yes	No	No	No	No	No	No	No	Yes	Yes
FreeIPA	Yes	No	Yes	No	Yes	Yes	Yes	Yes	Yes	Yes	Yes	Yes	Yes	Yes
Red Hat IdM	Yes	No	Yes	Yes	Yes	Yes	Yes	Yes	Yes	Yes	Yes	Yes	Yes	Yes
OpenLDAP	Yes	No	Yes	Yes	Yes	No	No	No	No	No	No	No	No	No
Azure Active Directory	Yes	Yes	Yes	Yes	No	No	Yes	No	Yes	Yes	Yes	Yes	Yes	Yes

- BRS: Backup Recovery System Backup and Restore
- DRP: Disaster Recovery Plan IT disaster recovery

== Client software ==
=== Cross-platform ===
- Apache Directory Server/Studio - an LDAP browser and directory client for Linux, OS X, and Microsoft Windows, and as a plug-in for the Eclipse development environment.
- JXplorer - a Java-based browser that runs in any operating environment.
- LDAP Account Manager - a PHP based webfrontend for managing various account types in an LDAP directory.
- phpLDAPadmin - a web-based LDAP administration tool for creating and editing LDAP entries in any LDAP server.
- RoundCube - an open source and free PHP IMAP client with support with LDAP based address books.
- OpenDJ - a Java-based LDAP server and directory client that runs in any operating environment, under license CDDL
- Dirdap – a free and open-source, lightweight desktop LDAP directory manager for fast administration of OpenLDAP and Microsoft Active Directory.

=== Linux/UNIX ===
- Evolution - the contacts part of GNOME's PIM can query LDAP servers.
- KAddressBook - the address book application for KDE, capable of querying LDAP servers.
- OpenLDAP - a free, open source implementation.
- System Security Services Daemon (SSSD) - a system service to access remote directories and authentication mechanisms

=== Mac OS X ===
- Contacts - an LDAP-aware address book application built into Mac OS X.
- Directory Utility - a utility for configuring access to several types of directory servers, including LDAP; built into Mac OS X.
- Workgroup Manager - a utility for configuring access to several types of directory servers, including LDAP; built into Mac OS X Server and one of Apple's Server Admin Tools.
- Slapd - from the Univ of Michigan

=== Microsoft Windows ===
- Active Directory Explorer - a freeware LDAP client tool from Microsoft
- LDAP Admin - a free, open source LDAP directory browser and editor

== Middleware ==
- Json2Ldap - a JSON-RPC-to-LDAP gateway
