= Mandriva Directory Server =

LDAP server developed by Mandriva

- Developer: Mandriva
- Stable release: 2.4.2 / 26 September 2011
- Operating system: Linux
- Type: Directory server
- License: GNU General Public License
- Website: Mandriva Directory Server

Mandriva Directory Server (MDS) is an LDAP server developed by Mandriva. This is similar to 389 Directory Server, Novell eDirectory etc. for managing resources & infrastructure within the network.

== See also ==
- Fedora Directory Server
- Novell eDirectory
- List of LDAP software
