= Open Directory =

Open Directory may refer to:

- The Open Directory Project (ODP), a human-maintained directory of websites also known as DMOZ
- Apple Open Directory, an LDAP-compatible directory service for Mac OS X Server
- The Sun Open Directory Service (OpenDS) project
