= OpenIDM =

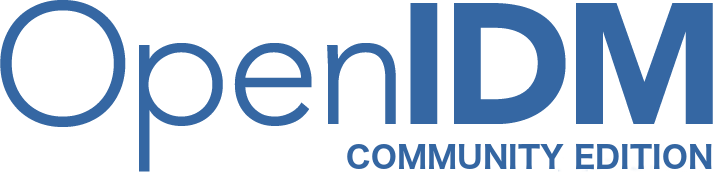
- Release: October 27, 2010
- Stable release: 7.1.2 / July 22, 2026
- Written in: Java
- Operating system: Cross-platform
- Available in: English
- Type: Identity management system
- License: CDDL
- Website: github.com/OpenIdentityPlatform/OpenIDM
- Repository: https://github.com/OpenIdentityPlatform/OpenIDM

OpenIDM is an open-source identity management system written in the Java programming language. The OpenIDM source code is available under the Common Development and Distribution License (CDDL). OpenIDM is designed with flexibility in mind, leverages JavaScript as default scripting language to define business rules during provisioning. All capabilities of OpenIDM expose RESTful interfaces. As an integration layer, OpenIDM leverages the Identity Connectors (adopted by ForgeRock as OpenICF) and has a set of default connectors.

== History ==
ForgeRock launched the OpenIDM project on October 27, 2010 at GOSCON in Portland following a 6-month internal development process.

ForgeRock felt there was no strong open source identity provisioning project, and launched OpenIDM under CDDL licensing for compatibility with OpenAM and OpenDJ. However, just giving access to an old, flattened X.0.0 source tree which usually still contains many bugs, can hardly be described as what is usually understood as Open Source. So since it prevents the community from taking part on developing within the latest version aka trunk, doesn't give any insights, what actually got fixed/features got merged, it should be considered closed source, now (end 2016).

Full leveraging the Open Source project Identity Connector Framework from Sun Microsystems as integration layer to resources, ForgeRock announced to adopt the project and forming a community around the framework, all under the new name OpenICF.

January 17, 2012 ForgeRock announces OpenIDM 2.0 of OpenIDM.

February 20, 2013 ForgeRock announced OpenIDM 2.1, part of the Open Identity Stack which is the latest stable release of OpenIDM.

August 11, 2014 ForgeRock announced OpenIDM 3.0.

Since November 2016, ForgeRock closed OpenIDM source code, renamed OpenIDM to Forgerock Identity Management and started to distribute it under commercial license.

OpenIDM 3.0.0 resumed to maintain by Open Identity Platform Community and issued new release.

May 21, 2024 Open Identity Platform community released OpenIDM 6.0.

== Roadmap ==
ForgeRock posted an OpenIDM roadmap stretching from release date to end of 2012 also outlining the project principles.

- OpenIDM 1.0, launched October 27, 2010.
- OpenIDM 2.0, released January 17, 2012 — provided the initial architecture, Basic CRUD capabilities all exposed via REST and password synchronization capabilities.
- OpenIDM 2.1, is to focus on workflow and business process engine integration.
- OpenIDM 2.2, is expected to introduce role based provisioning.
- OpenIDM 3.0, released under Open Identity Platform Community maintenance.
- OpenIDM 6.0, Added Java LTS versions support: 11, 17, 21
