= Edirectory (disambiguation) =

An Edirectory or Novell eDirectory (formerly known as Novell Directory Services, sometimes referred to as Netware Directory Services)

Edirectory also may refer to:

- Directory service for accessing and maintaining distributed information services over a computer network
  - Network Information Service, a type of directory service
- Online business directory software
