= DSML =

DSML may refer to:

- Directory Services Markup Language
- Domain-specific modeling language
