= Sun Java System Directory Server =

The Sun Java System Directory Server is a discontinued LDAP directory server and DSML server written in C and originally developed by Sun Microsystems. The Java System Directory Server is a component of the Java Enterprise System. Earlier iterations of Sun Java System Directory Server were known as Sun ONE Directory Server, iPlanet Directory Server, and, before that, Netscape Directory Server.

Sun Java System Directory Server became Sun Directory Server Enterprise Edition and is currently known as Oracle Directory Server Enterprise Edition (ODSEE).

The software was available free of charge for perpetual usage in individual, commercial, service provider, or research and instructional environments. It is still available for download at the Oracle website, the new official site for Sun products; however only the latest version (DSEE 7, rebranded as ODSEE 11.1.1.5.0) can be found in this site.

Sun started developing OpenDS in Java in 2011, due to too many issues with developing Sun Java System Directory Server with the C language. The code base has not been updated since 2011.

== Supported Internet standards ==
Directory Server supports the following RFCs: 2079, 2246, 2247, 2307, 2713, 2788, 2798, 2831, 2849, 2891, 3045, 3062, 3296, 3829, 3866, 4370, 4422, 4505, 4511, 4512, 4513, 4514, 4515, 4516, 4517, 4519, 4522, 4524, and 4532.

== Supported platforms ==
Directory Server is supported by Sun on the following platforms:

- Sun Solaris 9 and 10 Operating Systems
- Sun Solaris 10 with Trusted Extensions
- Sun OpenSolaris 2009.06
- Red Hat Enterprise Linux 4 and 5
- SuSE Linux Enterprise Server 10
- Hewlett-Packard HP-UX 11.23 (PA-RISC)
- Microsoft Windows Server 2003 and 2008 Standard Edition and Enterprise Edition

== See also ==
- OpenLDAP
- 389 Directory Server
- Oracle Identity Management
- Oracle Internet Directory
- List of LDAP software
