= M23 =

M23, M.23 or M-23 may refer to:

== Military ==
- HMS M23, a Royal Navy M15-class monitor
- M23 chemical mine, a US landmine
- March 23 Movement (M23), a rebel military group operating in the Democratic Republic of the Congo
  - M23 rebellion (2012–2013)
  - M23 campaign (2022–present)
- Sako M23, a Finnish family of assault and battle rifles

== Roads ==
- M23 motorway, a motorway in England
- M-23 (Michigan highway), a highway designation formerly used in Michigan
- Highway M23 (Ukraine)
- M23 (Cape Town), a Metropolitan Route in Cape Town, South Africa
- M23 (Pretoria), a Metropolitan Route in Pretoria, South Africa
- Federal Highway (Australia), part of which is given the designation "M23"

== Other uses ==
- M23 (New York City bus), a New York City Bus route in Manhattan
- BFW M.23, two-seater sports plane
- The Mathieu group M23 in the mathematical field of group theory
- m23 software distribution system, a Linux software distribution and management system
- McLaren M23, a race car
- Messier 23 (M23), an open star cluster in the constellation Sagittarius
- M23 derby, a football match between Brighton and Crystal Palace, England
- Samsung Galaxy M23 5G, an Android-based smartphone
