= Slapd =

Internet application protocol

The SLAPD (Standalone LDAP Daemon) and SLURPD (Stand-alone LDAP update replication daemon) are directory services used over Internet Protocol (IP) networks. These protocols originally evolved within the long-running project that developed the LDAP protocol. It was developed at the University of Michigan, and was the first Lightweight Directory Access Protocol (LDAP) software.

Today, many LDAP Server Implementations are derived from the same code base of the original SLAPD and/or evolutions of it.

== University of Michigan ==
Tim Howes of the University of Michigan, Steve Kille of Isode Limited, Wengyik Yeong of Performance Systems International and Colin Robbins of Nexor authored the original LDAP specification. In 1993, initial implementations of the LDAP standard were made by Howes at the University of Michigan, in the form of LDAPD as a proxy for the Quipu X.500 directory and SLAPD.

== Netscape Communications Corporation ==
In 1996, Netscape Communications Corporation hired several of the project's developers, who then worked on what became known as the Netscape Directory Server.

== SLAPD Implementations ==
- 389 Directory Server
- OpenLDAP

== See also ==
- List of LDAP software
