= Active Directory =

Directory service, created by Microsoft for Windows domain networks

Active Directory (AD) is a directory service developed by Microsoft for Windows domain networks. Windows Server operating systems include it as a set of processes and services. Originally, only centralized domain management used Active Directory. However, it ultimately became an umbrella title for various directory-based identity-related services.

A domain controller is a server running the Active Directory Domain Services (AD DS) role. It authenticates and authorizes all users and computers in a Windows domain-type network, assigning and enforcing security policies for all computers and installing or updating software. For example, when a user logs into a computer which is part of a Windows domain, Active Directory checks the submitted username and password and determines whether the user is a system administrator or a non-admin user. Furthermore, it allows the management and storage of information, provides authentication and authorization mechanisms, and establishes a framework to deploy other related services: Certificate Services, Active Directory Federation Services, Lightweight Directory Services, and Rights Management Services.

Active Directory uses Lightweight Directory Access Protocol (LDAP) versions 2 and 3, Microsoft's version of Kerberos, and DNS.

Robert R. King defined it in the following way:

"A domain represents a database. That database holds records about network services-things like computers, users, groups and other things that use, support, or exist on a network. The domain database is, in effect, Active Directory."

== History ==
Like many information-technology efforts, Active Directory originated out of a democratization of design using Requests for Comments (RFCs). The Internet Engineering Task Force (IETF) oversees the RFC process and has accepted numerous RFCs initiated by widespread participants. For example, LDAP underpins Active Directory. Also, X.500 directories and the Organizational Unit preceded the Active Directory concept that uses those methods. The LDAP concept began to emerge even before the founding of Microsoft in April 1975, with RFCs as early as 1971. RFCs contributing to LDAP include RFC 1823 (on the LDAP API, August 1995), RFC 2307, RFC 3062, and RFC 4533.

Microsoft previewed Active Directory in 1999, released it first with Windows 2000 Server edition, and revised it to extend functionality and improve administration in Windows Server 2003. Active Directory support was also added to Windows 95, Windows 98, and Windows NT 4.0 via patch, with some unsupported features. Additional improvements came with subsequent versions of Windows Server. In Windows Server 2008, Microsoft added further services to Active Directory, such as Active Directory Federation Services. The part of the directory in charge of managing domains, which was a core part of the operating system, was renamed Active Directory Domain Services (ADDS) and became a server role like others. "Active Directory" became the umbrella title of a broader range of directory-based services. According to Byron Hynes, everything related to identity was brought under Active Directory's banner.

== Active Directory Services ==
Active Directory Services consist of multiple directory services. The best known is Active Directory Domain Services, commonly abbreviated as AD DS or simply AD.

=== Domain Services ===
Active Directory Domain Services (AD DS) is the foundation of every Windows domain network. It stores information about domain members, including devices and users, verifies their credentials, and defines their access rights. The server running this service is called a domain controller. A domain controller is contacted when a user logs into a device, accesses another device across the network, or runs a line-of-business Metro-style app sideloaded into a machine.

Other Active Directory services (excluding LDS, as described below) and most Microsoft server technologies rely on or use Domain Services; examples include Group Policy, Encrypting File System, BitLocker, Domain Name Services, Remote Desktop Services, Exchange Server, and SharePoint Server.

The self-managed Active Directory DS must be distinct from managed Azure AD DS, a cloud product.

=== Lightweight Directory Services ===
Active Directory Lightweight Directory Services (AD LDS), previously called Active Directory Application Mode (ADAM), implements the LDAP protocol for AD DS. It runs as a service on Windows Server and offers the same functionality as AD DS, including an equal API. However, AD LDS does not require the creation of domains or domain controllers. It provides a Data Store for storing directory data and a Directory Service with an LDAP Directory Service Interface. Unlike AD DS, multiple AD LDS instances can operate on the same server.

=== Certificate Services ===
Active Directory Certificate Services (AD CS) establishes an on-premises public key infrastructure. It can create, validate, revoke and perform other similar actions, public key certificates for internal uses of an organization. These certificates can be used to encrypt files (when used with Encrypting File System), emails (per S/MIME standard), and network traffic (when used by virtual private networks, Transport Layer Security protocol or IPSec protocol).

AD CS predates Windows Server 2008, but its name was simply Certificate Services.

AD CS requires an AD DS infrastructure.

=== Federation Services ===
Active Directory Federation Services (AD FS) is a single sign-on service. With an AD FS infrastructure in place, users may use several web-based services (e.g. internet forum, blog, online shopping, webmail) or network resources using only one set of credentials stored at a central location, as opposed to having to be granted a dedicated set of credentials for each service. AD FS uses many popular open standards to pass token credentials such as SAML, OAuth or OpenID Connect. AD FS supports encryption and signing of SAML assertions. AD FS's purpose is an extension of that of AD DS: The latter enables users to authenticate with and use the devices that are part of the same network, using one set of credentials. The former enables them to use the same set of credentials in a different network.

As the name suggests, AD FS works based on the concept of federated identity.

AD FS requires an AD DS infrastructure, although its federation partner may not.

=== Rights Management Services ===
Active Directory Rights Management Services (AD RMS), previously known as Rights Management Services or RMS before Windows Server 2008, is server software that allows for information rights management, included with Windows Server. It uses encryption and selective denial to restrict access to various documents, such as corporate e-mails, Microsoft Word documents, and web pages. It also limits the operations authorized users can perform on them, such as viewing, editing, copying, saving, or printing. IT administrators can create pre-set templates for end users for convenience, but end users can still define who can access the content and what actions they can take.

== Logical structure ==
Active Directory is a service comprising a database and executable code. It is responsible for managing requests and maintaining the database. The Directory System Agent is the executable part, a set of Windows services and processes that run on Windows 2000 and later. Accessing the objects in Active Directory databases is possible through various interfaces such as LDAP, ADSI, messaging API, and Security Accounts Manager services.

=== Objects used ===
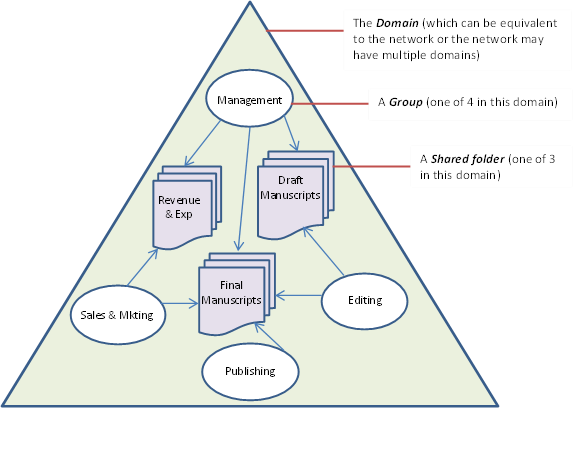
A simplified example of a publishing company's internal network. The company has four groups with varying permissions to the three shared folders on the network.

Active Directory structures consist of information about objects classified into two categories: resources (such as printers) and security principals (which include user or computer accounts and groups). Each security principal is assigned a unique security identifier (SID). An object represents a single entity, such as a user, computer, printer, or group, along with its attributes. Some objects may even contain other objects within them. Each object has a unique name, and its definition is a set of characteristics and information by a schema, which determines the storage in the Active Directory.

Administrators can extend or modify the schema using the schema object when needed. However, because each schema object is integral to the definition of Active Directory objects, deactivating or changing them can fundamentally alter or disrupt a deployment. Modifying the schema affects the entire system automatically, and new objects cannot be deleted, only deactivated. Changing the schema usually requires planning.

=== Forests, trees, and domains ===
In an Active Directory network, the framework that holds objects has different levels: the forest, tree, and domain. Domains within a deployment contain objects stored in a single replicable database, and the DNS name structure identifies their domains, the namespace. A domain is a logical group of network objects such as computers, users, and devices that share the same Active Directory database.

On the other hand, a tree is a collection of domains and domain trees in a contiguous namespace linked in a transitive trust hierarchy. The forest is at the top of the structure, a collection of trees with a standard global catalog, directory schema, logical structure, and directory configuration. The forest is a secure boundary that limits access to users, computers, groups, and other objects.

Domain-Boston
Domain-New York
Domain-Philly
Tree-Southern
Domain-Atlanta
Domain-Dallas

Domain-Dallas
OU-Marketing
Hewitt
Aon
Steve
OU-Sales
Bill
Ralph

Example of the geographical organizing of zones of interest within trees and domains

==== Organizational units ====
The objects held within a domain can be grouped into organizational units (OUs). OUs can provide hierarchy to a domain, ease its administration, and can resemble the organization's structure in managerial or geographical terms. OUs can contain other OUs—domains are containers in this sense. Microsoft recommends using OUs rather than domains for structure and simplifying the implementation of policies and administration. The OU is the recommended level at which to apply group policies, which are Active Directory objects formally named group policy objects (GPOs), although policies can also be applied to domains or sites (see below). The OU is the level at which administrative powers are commonly delegated, but delegation can be performed on individual objects or attributes as well.

Organizational units do not each have a separate namespace. As a consequence, for compatibility with Legacy NetBios implementations, user accounts with an identical SamAccountName are not allowed within the same domain even if the accounts objects are in separate OUs. This is because SamAccountName, a user object attribute, must be unique within the domain. However, two users in different OUs can have the same common name (CN), the name under which they are stored in the directory itself such as "fred.staff-ou.domain" and "fred.student-ou.domain", where "staff-ou" and "student-ou" are the OUs.

In general, the reason for this lack of allowance for duplicate names through hierarchical directory placement is that Microsoft primarily relies on the principles of NetBIOS, which is a flat-namespace method of network object management that, for Microsoft software, goes all the way back to Windows NT 3.1 and MS-DOS LAN Manager. Allowing for duplication of object names in the directory, or completely removing the use of NetBIOS names, would prevent backward compatibility with legacy software and equipment. However, disallowing duplicate object names in this way is a violation of the LDAP RFCs on which Active Directory is supposedly based.

As the number of users in a domain increases, conventions such as "first initial, middle initial, last name" (Western order) or the reverse (Eastern order) fail for common family names like Li (李), Smith or Garcia. Workarounds include adding a digit to the end of the username. Alternatives include creating a separate ID system of unique employee/student ID numbers to use as account names in place of actual users' names and allowing users to nominate their preferred word sequence within an acceptable use policy.

Because duplicate usernames cannot exist within a domain, account name generation poses a significant challenge for large organizations that cannot be easily subdivided into separate domains, such as students in a public school system or university who must be able to use any computer across the network.

===== Shadow groups =====
In Active Directory, organizational units (OUs) cannot be assigned as owners or trustees. Only groups are selectable, and members of OUs cannot be collectively assigned rights to directory objects.

In Microsoft's Active Directory, OUs do not confer access permissions, and objects placed within OUs are not automatically assigned access privileges based on their containing OU. It represents a design limitation specific to Active Directory, and other competing directories, such as Novell NDS, can set access privileges through object placement within an OU.

Active Directory requires a separate step for an administrator to assign an object in an OU as a group member also within that OU. Using only the OU location to determine access permissions is unreliable since the entity might not have been assigned to the group object for that OU yet.

A common workaround for an Active Directory administrator is to write a custom PowerShell or Visual Basic script to automatically create and maintain a user group for each OU in their Directory. The scripts run periodically to update the group to match the OU's account membership. However, they cannot instantly update the security groups anytime the directory changes, as occurs in competing directories, as security is directly implemented into the Directory. Such groups are known as shadow groups. Once created, these shadow groups are selectable in place of the OU in the administrative tools. Microsoft's Server 2008 reference documentation mentions shadow groups but does not provide instructions on creating them. Additionally, there are no available server methods or console snap-ins for managing these groups.

An organization must determine the structure of its information infrastructure by dividing it into one or more domains and top-level OUs. This decision is critical and can base on various models such as business units, geographical locations, IT service, object type, or a combination of these models. The immediate purpose of organizing OUs is to simplify administrative delegation and, secondarily, to apply group policies. While OUs serve as an administrative boundary, the forest itself is the only security boundary. All other domains must trust any administrator in the forest to maintain security.

=== Partitions ===
The Active Directory database is organized in partitions, each holding specific object types and following a particular replication pattern. Microsoft often refers to these partitions as 'naming contexts'. The 'Schema' partition defines object classes and attributes within the forest. The 'Configuration' partition contains information on the physical structure and configuration of the forest (such as the site topology). Both replicate all domains in the forest. The 'Domain' partition holds all objects created in that domain and replicates only within it.

Some directory partitions store forest wide configuration information and schema information; other directory partitions store information specific to individual domains, such as users, groups, and organizational units.

By default, the Active Directory Domain Service contains the following naming contexts:

- Schema NC: stores schema information that is replicated to domain controllers in all domains of the forest.
- Configuration NC: stores topology and other configuration data information that is replicated to domain controllers in all domains of the forest.
- Domain NC: store domain information such as users and computers that is replicated to domain controllers in that domain only.

== Physical structure ==
Sites are physical (rather than logical) groupings defined by one or more IP subnets. AD also defines connections, distinguishing low-speed (e.g., WAN, VPN) from high-speed (e.g., LAN) links. Site definitions are independent of the domain and OU structure and are shared across the forest. Sites play a crucial role in managing network traffic created by replication and directing clients to their nearest domain controllers (DCs). Microsoft Exchange Server 2007 uses the site topology for mail routing. Administrators can also define policies at the site level.

The Active Directory information is physically held on one or more peer domain controllers, replacing the NT PDC/BDC model. Each DC has a copy of the Active Directory. Member servers joined to Active Directory that are not domain controllers are called Member Servers. In the domain partition, a group of objects acts as copies of domain controllers set up as global catalogs. These global catalog servers offer a comprehensive list of all objects in the forest.

Global Catalog servers replicate all objects from all domains to themselves, providing an international listing of entities in the forest. However, to minimize replication traffic and keep the GC's database small, only selected attributes of each object are replicated, called the partial attribute set (PAS). The PAS can be modified by modifying the schema and marking features for replication to the GC. Earlier versions of Windows used NetBIOS to communicate. Active Directory is fully integrated with DNS and requires TCP/IP—DNS. To fully operate, the DNS server must support SRV resource records, also known as service records.

=== Replication ===
Active Directory uses multi-master replication to synchronize changes, meaning replicas pull changes from the server where the change occurred rather than being pushed to them. The Knowledge Consistency Checker (KCC) uses defined sites to manage traffic and create a replication topology of site links. Intra-site replication occurs frequently and automatically due to change notifications, which prompt peers to begin a pull replication cycle. Replication intervals between different sites are usually less consistent and don't usually use change notifications. However, it's possible to set it up to be the same as replication between locations on the same network if needed.

Each DS3, T1, and ISDN link can have a cost, and the KCC alters the site link topology accordingly. Replication may occur transitively through several site links on same-protocol site link bridges if the price is low. However, KCC automatically costs a direct site-to-site link lower than transitive connections. A bridgehead server in each zone can send updates to other DCs in the exact location to replicate changes between sites. To configure replication for Active Directory zones, activate DNS in the domain based on the site.

To replicate Active Directory, Remote Procedure Calls (RPC) over IP (RPC/IP) are used. SMTP is used to replicate between sites but only for modifications in the Schema, Configuration, or Partial Attribute Set (Global Catalog) GCs. It's not suitable for reproducing the default Domain partition.

=== Credential lag ===
Credential lag is the temporary period following a credential change or reset during which one or more systems continue to accept or require previously cached credentials. In Active Directory (AD) and hybrid identity environments, this delay typically results from:

- Domain controller replication latency: The time required for updated account attributes to replicate across geographically distributed domain controllers.
- Token and session caching: Modern authentication protocols (such as OAuth 2.0 or OpenID Connect) and mechanisms like Microsoft Entra ID Primary Refresh Tokens (PRT) may allow existing access tokens to remain valid until their scheduled expiration, even after a password reset.
- Scheduled identity synchronization: Third-party applications, cloud services, or Provisioning agents (such as SCIM or Microsoft Entra Connect) that synchronize authentication data periodically rather than querying Active Directory in real time.

For example, if a user changes an expired Windows domain password, Active Directory updates immediately. However, if an internal intranet application synchronizes its local credential database only every 15 minutes, the user will be unable to authenticate to that application using the new password until the next synchronization cycle completes.

== Implementation ==
Generally, a network utilizing Active Directory has more than one licensed Windows server computer. Backup and restore of Active Directory are possible for a network with a single domain controller. However, Microsoft recommends more than one domain controller to provide automatic failover protection of the directory. Domain controllers are ideally single-purpose for directory operations only and should not run any other software or role.

Since certain Microsoft products, like SQL Server and Exchange, can interfere with the operation of a domain controller, isolation of these products on additional Windows servers is advised. Combining them can complicate the configuration and troubleshooting of the domain controller or the other installed software more complex. If planning to implement Active Directory, a business should purchase multiple Windows server licenses to have at least two separate domain controllers. Administrators should consider additional domain controllers for performance or redundancy and individual servers for tasks like file storage, Exchange, and SQL Server since this will guarantee that all server roles are adequately supported.

One way to lower the physical hardware costs is by using virtualization. However, for proper failover protection, Microsoft recommends not running multiple virtualized domain controllers on the same physical hardware.

== Database ==
The Active-Directory database, the directory store, in Windows 2000 Server uses the JET Blue-based Extensible Storage Engine (ESE98). Each domain controller's database is limited to 16 terabytes and 2 billion objects (but only 1 billion security principals). Microsoft has created NTDS databases with more than 2 billion objects. NT4's Security Account Manager could support up to 40,000 objects. It has two main tables: the data table and the link table. Windows Server 2003 added a third main table for security descriptor single instancing.

Programs may access the features of Active Directory via the COM interfaces provided by Active Directory Service Interfaces.

== Trusting ==
To allow users in one domain to access resources in another, Active Directory uses trusts.

Trusts inside a forest are automatically created when domains are created. The forest sets the default boundaries of trust, and implicit, transitive trust is automatic for all domains within a forest.

=== Terminology ===
One-way trust
One domain allows access to users on another domain, but the other domain does not allow access to users on the first domain.
Two-way trust
Two domains allow access to users on both domains.
Trusted domain
The domain that is trusted; whose users have access to the trusting domain.
Transitive trust
A trust that can extend beyond two domains to other trusted domains in the forest.
Intransitive trust
A one way trust that does not extend beyond two domains.
Explicit trust
A trust that an admin creates. It is not transitive and is one way only.
Cross-link trust
An explicit trust between domains in different trees or the same tree when a descendant/ancestor (child/parent) relationship does not exist between the two domains.
Shortcut
Joins two domains in different trees, transitive, one- or two-way.
Forest trust
Applies to the entire forest. Transitive, one- or two-way.
Realm
Can be transitive or nontransitive (intransitive), one- or two-way.
External
Connect to other forests or non-Active Directory domains. Nontransitive, one- or two-way.
PAM trust
A one-way trust used by Microsoft Identity Manager from a (possibly low-level) production forest to a (Windows Server 2016 functionality level) 'bastion' forest, which issues time-limited group memberships.

== Management tools ==
Microsoft Active Directory management tools include:

- Active Directory Administrative Center (Introduced with Windows Server 2012 and above),
- Active Directory Users and Computers,
- Active Directory Domains and Trusts,
- Active Directory Sites and Services,
- ADSI Edit,
- Local Users and Groups,
- Active Directory Schema snap-ins for Microsoft Management Console (MMC),
- SysInternals ADExplorer.

These management tools may not provide enough functionality for efficient workflow in large environments. Some third-party tools extend the administration and management capabilities. They provide essential features for a more convenient administration process, such as automation, reports, integration with other services, etc.

== Unix integration ==
Varying levels of interoperability with Active Directory can be achieved on most Unix-like operating systems (including Unix, Linux, Mac OS X or Java and Unix-based programs) through standards-compliant LDAP clients, but these systems usually do not interpret many attributes associated with Windows components, such as Group Policy and support for one-way trusts.

Third parties offer Active Directory integration for Unix-like platforms, including:

- PowerBroker Identity Services, formerly Likewise (BeyondTrust, formerly Likewise Software) – Allows a non-Windows client to join Active Directory
- ADmitMac (Thursby Software Systems)
- Samba (free software under GPLv3) – Can act as a fully functional Active Directory

The schema additions shipped with Windows Server 2003 R2 include attributes that map closely enough to RFC 2307 to be generally usable. The reference implementation of RFC 2307, nss_ldap and pam_ldap provided by PADL.com, support these attributes directly. The default schema for group membership complies with RFC 2307bis (proposed). Windows Server 2003 R2 includes a Microsoft Management Console snap-in that creates and edits the attributes.

An alternative option is to use another directory service as non-Windows clients authenticate to this while Windows Clients authenticate to Active Directory. Non-Windows clients include 389 Directory Server (formerly Fedora Directory Server, FDS), ViewDS v7.2 XML Enabled Directory, and Sun Microsystems Sun Java System Directory Server. The latter two are both able to perform two-way synchronization with Active Directory and thus provide a "deflected" integration.

Another option is to use OpenLDAP with its translucent overlay, which can extend entries in any remote LDAP server with additional attributes stored in a local database. Clients pointed at the local database see entries containing both the remote and local attributes, while the remote database remains completely untouched.

Administration (querying, modifying, and monitoring) of Active Directory can be achieved via many scripting languages, including PowerShell, VBScript, JScript/JavaScript, Perl, Python, and Ruby. Free and non-free Active Directory administration tools can help to simplify and possibly automate Active Directory management tasks.

Since October 2017 Amazon AWS offers integration with Microsoft Active Directory.

== Modern and hybrid environments ==
While the core architecture of Active Directory Domain Services (AD DS) remains largely unchanged to ensure backward compatibility with legacy systems, its role in enterprise IT has evolved with the shift toward cloud computing. Modern enterprise deployments typically utilize Active Directory within a hybrid identity framework rather than as an isolated on-premises service.

=== Integration with Microsoft Entra ID ===
The shift toward cloud-native identity management led to the creation of Microsoft Entra ID (formerly Azure Active Directory). Unlike traditional AD DS, Microsoft Entra ID is a cloud-based identity platform that uses modern web authentication protocols such as OAuth 2.0, SAML 2.0, and OpenID Connect instead of Kerberos and LDAP.

To bridge on-premises directories with the cloud, organizations deploy synchronization tools such as Microsoft Entra Connect. This utility replicates user accounts, groups, and password hashes from Active Directory to the cloud, enabling single sign-on (SSO) across local network resources and cloud services like Microsoft 365.

=== Contemporary security focus ===
As global network bandwidth increased and legacy WAN links became obsolete, Active Directory administration shifted focus from site-link cost calculations toward identity security and threat mitigation. Active Directory remains a primary target in enterprise cyberattacks, prompting administrators to prioritize:

- Identity attack mitigation: Defending against lateral movement techniques, Kerberos ticket abuse (such as Pass-the-Ticket, Golden Ticket, and Kerberoasting attacks), and password spraying.
- Privileged Access Management (PAM): Implementing administrative tiering models, "least privilege" access controls, and administrative bastion forests to prevent endpoint compromise from escalating to total domain takeover.
- Zero Trust integration: Extending on-premises authentication to cloud-based Conditional Access policies, enforcing multi-factor authentication (MFA) and continuous risk evaluation for login attempts.

== See also ==
- AGDLP (implementing role based access controls using nested groups)
- Apple Open Directory
- Flexible single master operation
- FreeIPA
- List of LDAP software
- System Security Services Daemon (SSSD)
- Univention Corporate Server
