= OUC =

OUC may refer to

== Education ==
- Oslo University College, Oslo, Norway
- Okanagan University College, Kelowna, British Columbia, Canada
- Ocean University of China, Qingdao, Shandong, China
- Otaru University of Commerce, Otaru, Hokkaidō, Japan
- Open University of Cyprus, Lefkosia (Nicosia), Cyprus

== Other uses ==
- Orlando Utilities Commission, Orlando, Florida, US
- Organization Unit Code (see Organizational Unit)
