= IBM SecureWay Directory =

Directory server software

IBM SecureWay Directory was the first directory server offering from IBM. Its latest release is called IBM Tivoli Directory Server. IBM Secureway Directory wasn't changed until the Release 5.1 was then known as IBM Directory Server. In the next release of the product, I.E. Release 5.2, the name was again changed to include the IBM Tivoli Framework, and is known as IBM Tivoli Directory Server. The latest release offered (as of July 2007) is ITDS 6.1.
