= System Security Services Daemon =

Software for Linux

SSSD
- Other names: System Security Services Daemon
- Initial release: December 18, 2009; 16 years ago
- Stable release: 2.12.0 / January 15, 2026; 4 months ago
- Written in: C
- License: GPLv3
- Website: sssd.io
- Repository: github.com/SSSD/sssd

The System Security Services Daemon (SSSD) is software originally developed for the Linux operating system (OS) that provides a set of daemons to manage access to remote directory services and authentication mechanisms. The beginnings of SSSD lie in the open-source software project FreeIPA (Identity, Policy and Audit). The purpose of SSSD is to simplify system administration of authenticated and authorised user access involving multiple distinct hosts. It is intended to provide single sign-on capabilities to networks based on Unix-like OSs that are similar in effect to the capabilities provided by Microsoft Active Directory Domain Services to Microsoft Windows networks.
