= Oracle Internet Directory =

Directory service

Oracle Internet Directory (OID) is a directory service produced by Oracle Corporation, which functions compatible with LDAP version 3.

== Functionality ==
OID makes the following features available from within an Oracle database environment:

- integration with Oracle 8i and subsequent databases for ease of use and administration
- a scalable, multi-platform listing structure for reliable and safe intranet integration
- synchronization of OID-based listings (also with distributed applications)
- integration of existing public key certificates, digital wallets (e-wallets) and entrance privileges
- co-existence with other LDAP implementations via Oracle's Directory Integration Platform (DIP)
- administration tools, including:
  - routing policies
  - system management objects such as Oracle Directory Manager (also known as "oidadmin" or "ODM")
  - technical support regarding the quality of the services
  - delegated administrative service

== Implementation ==
OID uses standard Oracle database structures to store its internal tables.

In Oracle version 9 databases, by default, many Oracle LDAP Table Stores use tablespaces with names beginning with the OLTS_ (and occasionally P1TS_) prefixes. Relevant default schemas used may include ODS (for "Oracle directory server") and ODSCOMMON.

== Operation ==
The OID Control Utility (OIDCTL) serves as a command-line tool for starting and stopping the OID server. The OID Monitor process interprets and executes the OIDCTL commands.

== Marketing ==
In comparing Oracle Internet Directory with its competitors, Oracle Corporation stresses that it uses as its foundation an Oracle database; whereas many competing products (such as Oracle Directory Server Enterprise Edition and Novell eDirectory) do not rely on an enterprise-strength relational database, but instead on embedded database engines similar to Berkeley DB. Integration with the Oracle database makes many of the technologies available for Oracle database available for Oracle Internet Directory, and improvements that Oracle makes in the database space can instantly flow through to its LDAP implementation.

For marketing purposes, OID forms part of the Oracle Identity Management suite of Oracle Application Server.

=== Distribution ===
Oracle database version 9 included OID bundled as an extra facility. As of 2006 OID shipped with the Oracle Application Server version 10.

As of 2007 Oracle Corporation makes the most recent version of OID available only as part of the Identity Management-suite bundling of Oracle Application Server (10.1.4.0.1).

Oracle Internet Directory 11g forms part of Oracle directory services (ODS).

== See also ==
- List of LDAP software
- Oracle Identity Management
- Oracle Directory Server Enterprise Edition

== Benchmarks ==
- 50 Million Users on Sparc T5
- 10 Million Users on Exalogic
- 500 Million Users on Exadata
- 2 Billion Users
