= JXplorer =

Open-source software

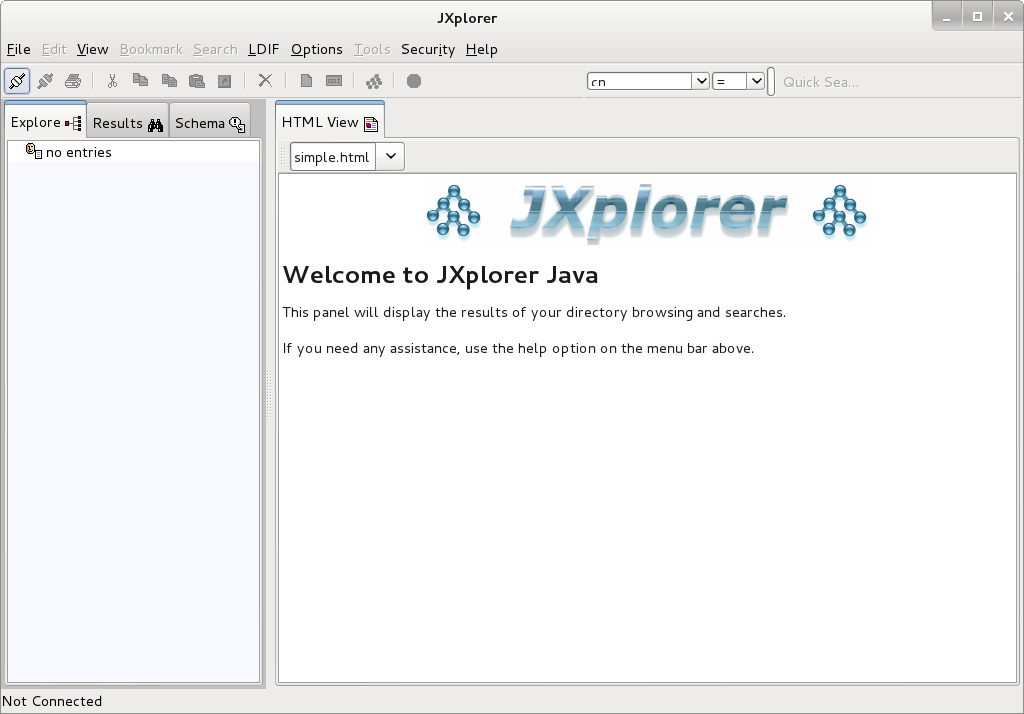
- Developer(s): Chris Betts, Trudi Ersvaer
- Stable release: 3.3.1 / August 2013
- Written in: Java
- Operating system: cross platform
- Type: LDAP
- License: Apache equivalent license
- Website: jxplorer.org

JXplorer is a free, open-source client for browsing Lightweight Directory Access Protocol (LDAP) servers and LDAP Data Interchange Format (LDIF) files. It is released under an Apache-equivalent license. JXplorer is written in Java and is platform independent, configurable, and has been translated into a number of languages. In total, as of 2018, JXplorer has been downloaded over 2 million times from SourceForge and is bundled with several Linux distributions.

Several common Linux distributions include JXplorer Software for LDAP server administration. The software also runs on BSD-variants, AIX, HP-UX, OS X, Solaris, Windows (2000, XP) and z/OS.

Key features are:

- SSL, SASL and GSSAPI
- DSML
- LDIF
- Localisation (currently available in German, French, Japanese, Traditional Chinese, Simplified Chinese, Hungarian);
- Optional LDAP filter constructor GUI; extensible architecture

The primary authors and maintainers are Chris Betts and Trudi Ersvaer, originally both working in the CA (then Computer Associates) eTrust Directory (now CA Directory) software lab in Melbourne, Australia. Version 3.3, the '10th Anniversary Edition' was released in July 2012.

== See also ==
- List of LDAP software
