= XML Enabled Directory =

XML Enabled Directory (XED) is a framework for managing objects represented using the Extensible Markup Language (XML). XED builds on X.500 and LDAP directory services technologies.

XED was originally designed in 2003 by Steven Legg of eNitiatives (formerly of eB2Bcom and Adacel Technologies) and Daniel Prager (formerly of Deakin University).

The XML Enabled Directory (XED) framework leverages existing Lightweight Directory Access Protocol (LDAP) and X.500 directory technology to create a directory service that stores, manages and transmits Extensible Markup Language (XML) format data, while maintaining interoperability with LDAP clients, X.500 Directory User Agents (DUAs), and X.500 Directory System Agents (DSAs).

The main features of XED are:

- semantically equivalent XML renditions of existing directory protocols,
- XML renditions of directory data,
- the ability to accept at run time, user defined attribute syntaxes specified in a variety of XML schema languages,
- the ability to perform filter matching on the parts of XML format attribute values.
- the flexibility for implementors to develop XED clients using only their favoured XML schema language.

The XML Enabled Directory allows directory entries to contain XML formatted data as attribute values. Furthermore, the attribute syntax can be specified in any one of a variety of XML schema languages that the directory understands.

The directory server is then able to perform data validation and semantically meaningful matching of XML documents, or their parts, on behalf of client applications, making the implementation of XML-based applications easier and faster.

XML applications can also exploit the directory's traditional capabilities of cross-application data sharing, data distribution, data replication, user authentication and user access control, further lowering the cost of building new XML applications

XED Implementations

The eNitiatives' ViewDS Discovery Server is an organizational directory system designed for scalability. Built in compliance with open standards, it supports X.500, LDAP, XED and ACP133. This standard compliance allows ViewDS to interface with a variety of current and future applications.
