= Identity Connectors =

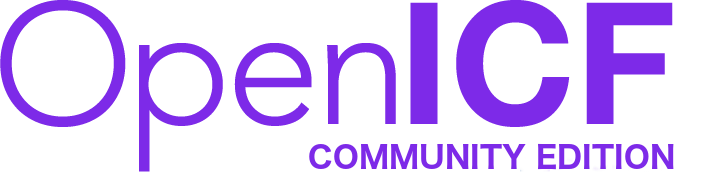
- Developers: Sun Microsystems, ForgeRock, Open Identity Platform Community
- Stable release: 1.6 / May 21, 2024
- Repository: https://github.com/OpenIdentityPlatform/OpenICF
- Written in: Java
- Operating system: Cross-platform
- Type: Connector Framework
- License: Common Development and Distribution License
- Website: github.com/OpenIdentityPlatform/OpenICF

The Identity Connectors Framework and Toolkit is built to help drive development of Connectors. Connectors provide a consistent generic layer between applications and target resources. The main focus of the API is provisioning identity operations and password management. The toolkit is intended to facilitate development with as few dependences as possible. Identity Connectors is an open-source project.

One of the main features of the framework is decoupling Connectors from any application that uses them. This means each Connector implementation can be easily replaced and not necessarily depend on a specific version of the framework. In addition an application may choose to use multiple Connectors which can require class path isolation. With class path isolation there is no issue with conflicting 3rd party libraries. An application is only required to couple to the Framework and not to any specific Connector.
