= Ping Identity =

American information technology company

- Type: Private
- Industry: Identity Security/Identity Access Management (IAM) software & services
- Founded: 2002; 24 years ago
- Founders: Andre Durand; Bryan Field-Elliot
- Headquarters: Denver, CO, United States
- Number of locations: 11
- Key people: Andre Durand (CEO)
- Products: Single Sign-On (SSO); Multi-factor authentication (MFA); Unified directory services; Access security management; API threat protection; Information and data governance
- Revenue: ▲US$299 million (2021)
- Operating income: ▼US$−79 million (2021)
- Net income: ▼US$−64 million (2021)
- Total assets: ▲US$1.18 billion (2021)
- Total equity: ▲US$741 million (2021)
- Owner: Thoma Bravo
- Number of employees: 2,311 (2026)
- Website: pingidentity.com

Ping Identity Corporation is an American intelligent identity and access management (IAM) company that develops federated identity management, secure access, authentication technology, and continuous identity assurance for enterprise organizations. Founded in 2002 by Andre Durand and Bryan Field-Elliot, the company's platform covers workforce, customer, partner, edge computing, and AI use cases.

After Thoma Bravo acquired Ping Identity in 2022 and ForgeRock in 2023, ForgeRock was integrated into Ping Identity. Ping Identity is headquartered in Denver, Colorado and operates globally, with offices in North America, Europe, and the Asia-Pacific region.

== History ==
=== Founding through 2014 ===
Ping Identity Corporation was founded in 2002 by Andre Durand and Bryan Field-Elliot, in Denver, Colorado. The company develops intelligent identity and access management (IAM) platforms, specializing in identity federation management, self-hosted identity access management, and single sign-on (SSO) solutions for workforce, customer, and partner, and AI-related use cases. Its secure-access and authentication technologies are used as an alternative to passwords, positioning the company alongside other organizations working to establish password-replacement standards. In the IAM sector, Ping Identity competes against vendors that include Microsoft, Okta, CyberArk, IBM, SailPoint, and Cisco.

Ping Identity raised a Series A funding round on April 16, 2004. This was followed by a $21 million round in 2011, a $44 million round in 2013, and a $35 million investment led by Kohlberg Kravis Roberts in 2014.

=== 2014-2020 ===
In 2014, Ping Identity acquired Accells Technologies and gained access to several mobile authentication patents.

Vista Equity Partners, a private equity firm based in Austin, Texas, acquired majority ownership of Ping Identity in a leveraged buyout for $600 million on June 1, 2016. At the time of the sale, Ping Identity had already taken $125 million in funding. Shortly after the buyout, Ping Identity acquired UnboundID, and expanded its customer identity and directory capabilities. In 2018, the company acquired Elastic Beam, an API security firm, adding API security technology to its platform.

In September 2019, Vista Equity Partners took the company public, in what was the first initial public offering (IPO) for one of the firm's portfolio companies. Goldman Sachs led Ping Identity's IPO, and the company was listed on the New York Stock Exchange under the ticker symbol PING.

Ping Identity continued to expand its products through a number of acquisitions, including ShoCard and Symphonic Software in 2020, and SecuredTouch and Singular Key in 2021. The SecuredTouch acquisition allowed Ping to expand its intelligence and customer identity capabilities, which, at the time, accounted for about half of the company’s global revenue. The acquisition gave Ping Identity’s customers bot detection capabilities, something not previously available. The Singular Key acquisition added identity orchestration technology to Ping’s platform.

=== 2021-present ===
In 2021, Ping Identity released its PingOne Cloud Platform and Dynamic Authorization offering.

In August 2022, Thoma Bravo agreed to buy Ping Identity in an all-cash transaction valued at around $2.8 billion. The acquisition closed on October 18, 2022. Upon its completion, Ping Identity returned to private ownership with its stock no longer listed on the New York Stock Exchange. On August 23, 2023, Ping Identity and ForgeRock were combined following Thoma Bravo's acquisition of ForgeRock. The combination allowed Ping Identity to present a broader identity platform.

In 2025 Ping Identity was named a Leader in the Gartner Magic Quadrant for Access Management for the ninth consecutive year. In April 2026, the company received the 2026 Google Cloud Security Partner of the Year Award for Identity & Access Management.

By 2026, Ping Identity managed over eight billion accounts. The acquisition of Procyon in 2025 expanded Ping Identity's privileged-access offerings. In 2026 the company completed its acquisition of Keyless, and expanded its biometric authentication services with the integration of Keyless’s Zero Knowledge Biometrics into the Ping Identity platform. The acquisition also expanded Ping’s authentication options for frontline workers and shared terminal environments.

== Products ==
Ping Identity provides an intelligent identity and access management (IAM) platform designed to identify, manage, access, govern, protect, and orchestrate identity.

The platform supports workforce, customer, partner, and AI-related use cases. Product groupings include PingOne cloud services, Advanced Identity software and cloud offerings, and enterprise and hybrid products.

Some of Ping Identity’s products and capabilities include PingOne for cloud identity and access management, PingID and PingOne MFA for multifactor authentication, PingFederate for single sign-on capabilities, PingAccess and PingOne Advanced Identity Cloud for access management, PingDirectory for Unified Director Services, PingAuthorize for policy-based access control, PingIntelligence for API Security, PingOne Protect for threat detection, and PingOne Verify, and PingOne DaVinci for Identity Verification, Governance, and Orchestration.

In 2026, the company expanded its products and services to address the ongoing identity assurance and security needs related to artificial intelligence. The included the announcement of Universal Services, which Ping Identity described as supporting continuous identity assurance to shift identity security from single checks to ongoing verification.

Additionally, a new Identity for AI suite was announced to manage artificial intelligence agents. The suite includes Agent IAM Core, Agent Gateway, and Agent Detection. These services work during sign-in and while agents operate to establish agent identity, apply delegated authority during operation, and identify agent activity across enterprise environments.

In May, Ping Identity and OLOID released a joint solution called Verified Trust for Clinical Workforce, which brought passwordless, biometric-enabled identity to shared-device hospital environments. Later in the year, Ping Identity introduced additional AI-specific capabilities, including programmable identity, agent discovery and governance, and privileged access for desktop agents.

== Standards ==
Ping Identity participates in identity standards and interoperability efforts including the FIDO Alliance and the OpenID Foundation. Its products support open standards and protocols such as SAML, OAuth 2.0, OpenID Connect, and Financial-grade API (FAPI).
