= M23 software distribution system =

Software distribution system

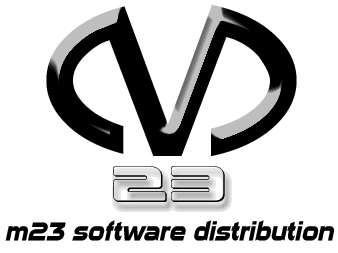
Official logo of the m23 software distribution system

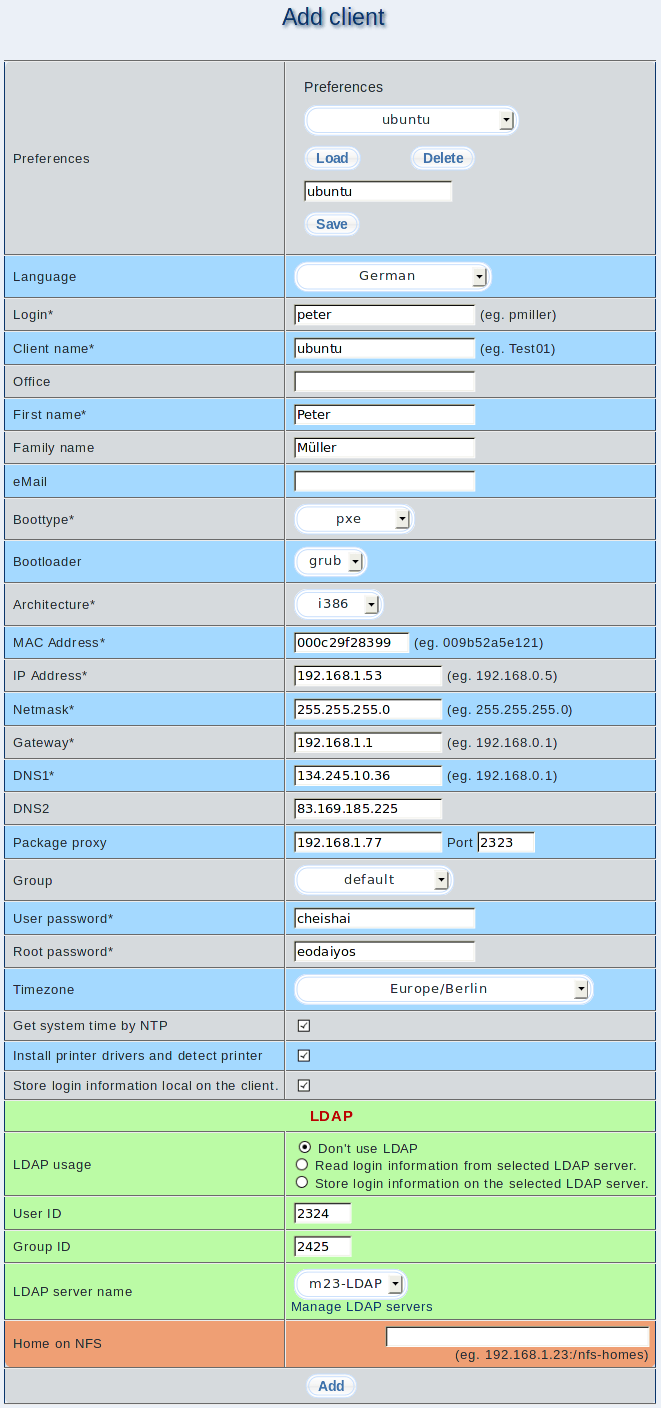
Screenshot of the m23 administration interface (Add client)

Screenshot of the m23 administration interface (Extended partitioning and formatting)

m23 is a software distribution and management system for the Debian, Ubuntu, Kubuntu Linux, Xubuntu, Linux Mint, elementary OS, Fedora, CentOS and openSUSE distributions.

m23 can partition and format clients and install a Linux operating system and any number of software packages like office packages, graphic tools, server applications or games via the m23 system. The entire administration is done via a webbrowser and is possible from all computers having access to the m23 server. m23 is developed predominantly by Hauke Goos-Habermann since the end of 2002.

m23 differentiates between servers and clients. An m23 server is used for software distribution and the management of the clients. Computers which are administered (e.g. software is installed) through the m23 server are the clients.

The client is booted over the network during the installation of the operating system. It is possible to start the client with a boot ROM on its network card, a boot disk or a boot CD. The client's hardware is detected and set up. The gathered hardware and partition information is sent to the m23 server. Afterwards, this information is shown in the m23 administration interface. Now the administrator has to choose how to partition and format the client. There are other settings, too, e.g. the distribution to be installed on the client.

The m23 clients can be installed as workstation with the graphical user interfaces KDE 5.x, GNOME 3.x, Xfce, Unity, LXDE and pure X11 or as a server without graphical subsystem. In most server setups, the server does not need a user interface because most of the server software runs in text mode.

M23 is released under the GNU GPL.

== Features ==
- Three steps to a complete client: To install a client via m23 is rather simple. Only three steps are needed for a completely installed client.
- Integration of existing clients into m23: Existing Debian-based systems can be assimilated into the m23 system easily and administered like a normal client (installed with m23).
- Group functions: The group functions allows the management of a large number of clients that need to be updated or to install new software or if other routine jobs need to be done. E.g. a new software package can be installed on all clients or be removed from all clients of a group.
- Mass installation: The mass installation tools allow to install many clients with similar requirements at once. A virtual client, that holds the basic settings (such as the default gateway or the group name), is defined. This virtual client can be used to derive and install an arbitrary number of (real) clients.
- Imaging: Installation using image files: An image file of a partition or entire harddisk can be used to install other clients. These image files are taken from installed clients with all their software packages and settings.
- Support for software RAIDs: Partitions or entire harddrives can be combined into software RAIDs. m23 supports the RAID levels 0, 1, 4, 5, 6 and 10. RAIDs can be used like normal partitions to install operating systems to or to use them as swap or storage space.
- User management with LDAP: User accounts can be stored on a central LDAP server. This increases the ease of use in environments with many clients and a lot of users. The OpenLDAP server is shipped with the m23 server and can be administered via the highly integrated phpLDAPadmin.
- Pool builder: The pool builder makes it possible to combine software packages from different media (CD, DVD, internet) on the m23 server and convert them to a local package source. These package sources can be used to install clients. This can be done without an internet connection or if the internet connection is rather slow. It is possible, too, to add selfmade packages to the pool.
