= NetInfo =

Distributed network configuration database

NetInfo was a distributed network configuration database in NeXTSTEP and Mac OS X versions up through Mac OS X Tiger (10.4). NetInfo stored network-wide configuration information, such as users and groups, in a binary database consisting of directories that could optionally be obtained from a domain server. NetInfo replaced many Unix system configuration files, though they are still present for running the machine in single user mode; most Unix APIs wrapped NetInfo instead.

== History ==
NetInfo was introduced in NeXTSTEP version 0.9, and replaced both the Unix system configuration files and Sun Microsystems' Network Information Service (Yellow Pages) on NeXT computers. It immediately caused controversy. Not only was NetInfo unique to NeXT computers (although NeXT later licensed NetInfo to Xedoc, an Australian software company who produced NetInfo for other UNIX systems), DNS queries went through NetInfo. This meant basic tasks such as translating a UNIX UID to a user name string could stall because NetInfo was stuck on a DNS lookup. At first, it was possible to disable NetInfo and use the Unix system files, but starting in NeXTSTEP version 2, this disabled DNS support. Thus, NeXT computers became notorious for locking a user out of everyday tasks because a DNS server had stopped responding.

The Mac OS X version of NetInfo remedied this (and many other problems), but by this time popular alternatives had emerged. Apple moved away from using NetInfo towards LDAP.. Mac OS X Tiger (10.4) was the last version to support NetInfo. Beginning with Mac OS X Leopard (10.5), NetInfo was completely phased out and replaced by a new local search node named dslocal, which uses standard property list files in /var/db/dslocal/.

== Files ==
The NetInfo Database was stored in /private/var/db/netinfo/local.nidb/, and could only be accessed by root. It could also be viewed and modified through its application programming interface, the NetInfo Manager utility, or command line tools such as niutil.

As NetInfo was completely removed from Mac OS X Leopard (10.5), the NetInfo utilities have been phased out and replaced by other tools.

== Data ==
NetInfo had directories for the following data:

- afpuser_aliases
- aliases
- exports (nfs shares)
- groups
- machines
- mounts
- networks
- printers
- protocols
- rpcs
- services
- users

== See also ==
- Apple Open Directory
