= Apple Open Directory =

Dictionary service by Apple

Apple Open Directory is the LDAP directory service model implementation from Apple Inc. A directory service is software which stores and organizes information about a computer network's users and network resources and which allows network administrators to manage users' access to the resources.

In the context of macOS Server, Open Directory describes a shared LDAPv3 directory domain and a corresponding authentication model composed of Apple Password Server and Kerberos 5 tied together using a modular Directory Services system. Apple Open Directory is a fork of OpenLDAP.

The term Open Directory can also be used to describe the entire directory services framework used by macOS and macOS Server. In this context, it describes the role of a macOS or macOS Server system when it is connected to an existing directory domain, in which context it is sometimes referred to as Directory Services.

Apple, Inc. also publishes an API called the OpenDirectory framework, permitting macOS applications to interrogate and edit the Open Directory data.

With the release of Mac OS X Leopard (10.5), Apple chose to move away from using the NetInfo directory service (originally found in NeXTSTEP and OPENSTEP), which had been used by default for all local accounts and groups in every release of Mac OS X from 10.0 to 10.4. Mac OS X 10.5 now uses Directory Services and its plugins for all directory information. Local accounts are now registered in the Local Plugin, which uses XML property list (plist) files stored in /var/db/dslocal/nodes/Default/ as its backing storage.

== Implementation in macOS Server ==
macOS Server can host an Open Directory domain when configured as an Open Directory Master. In addition to its local directory, this OpenLDAP-based LDAPv3 domain is designed to store centralized management data, user, group, and computer accounts, which other systems can access. The directory domain is paired with the Open Directory Password Server and, optionally, a Kerberos realm. Either provides an authentication model and stores password information outside of the directory domain itself.

For Kerberos authentication, the Kerberos realm can either be hosted by a Kerberos key distribution center (KDC) running on the server system, or the server can participate in an existing Kerberos realm.

For services that are not Kerberized, the Password Server provides the following Simple Authentication and Security Layer-based authentication methods:

- APOP
- CRAM-MD5
- Diffie–Hellman key exchange
- Digest-MD5
- MS-CHAPv2
- NTLM v1 and v2
- Lan Manager
- WebDAV-Digest

Any Mac OS X Server system prior to 10.7 (Lion) configured as an Active Directory Master can act as a Windows Primary Domain Controller (PDC), providing domain authentication services to Microsoft Windows clients.

== Directory services framework ==
In a more general sense, Open Directory can describe the plugins model used by Directory Utility and the directory services framework in macOS and macOS Server. This could be thought of as analogous to the Name Service Switch systems of some other Unix-like operating systems. When connected to a directory system, a macOS client or Server can authenticate users, lookup contacts, perform service discovery and name resolution with the following types of directories:

- Authentication and contacts
  - Microsoft Active Directory
  - LDAPv3, including an Open Directory domain or RFC 2307-compliant system
  - Apple/NeXT NetInfo domains
  - BSD flat files and NIS
- Service discovery and name resolution
  - AppleTalk
  - Windows (NetBIOS and WINS)
  - Service Location Protocol (SLP)
  - Multicast DNS (Bonjour/Zeroconf)

== History ==
Open Directory began with Mac OS X Server 10.2. In this initial form, Open Directory consisted of a network-visible NetInfo directory domain and a corresponding Authentication Manager service for storing passwords outside of the directory. Version 10.2 also included support for Kerberos. Mac OS X versions 10.1 and 10.0 stored user password information within the directory domain using crypt password authentication authorities, but version 10.2 paved the way for the current Shadow Hash and Password Server mechanisms.

Password Server is the successor to Authentication Manager, and was introduced in Open Directory 2 in Mac OS X Server 10.3. Open Directory 2 was also the first version to use LDAPv3 as the directory domain.

Mac OS X Server 10.4 includes Open Directory 3, which introduced Active Directory domain member support, trusted directory binding, and increased robustness.

Mac OS X Server 10.5 features Open Directory 4 with support for cross-domain authorization and a built-in RADIUS server for managing AirPort base stations. Open Directory 4 no longer includes elements of NetInfo.

== See More ==
- List of LDAP software
- Active Directory
- FreeIPA
- NetInfo
