= PhpLDAPadmin =

Application to manage Lightweight Directory Access Protocol

phpLDAPadmin
- Original author: David Smith
- Developer: Deon George
- Release: 2003
- Stable release: 2.3.11 / May 16, 2026; 59 days ago
- Written in: PHP
- Available in: Catalan, Chinese (simplified), Dutch, English, French, German, Hungarian, Italian, Japanese, Polish, Portuguese (Brazilian), Russian, Spanish and Swedish
- Type: LDAP administration
- License: GPL
- Website: phpldapadmin.org
- Repository: github.com/leenooks/phpLDAPadmin

phpLDAPadmin is a web app for administering Lightweight Directory Access Protocol (LDAP) servers. It's written in the PHP programming language, and is licensed under the GNU General Public License. The application is available in 14 languages and supports UTF-8 encoded directory strings.

== History ==
The project began in Fall of 2002 when Dave Smith, a student from Brigham Young University (BYU) and lead developer, needed a robust web application to manage his LDAP servers. Originally, phpLDAPadmin was called DaveDAP, but in August 2003, the name was changed to phpLDAPadmin. Since that time, the software has been downloaded approximately 150 times per day, and is commonly used throughout the world. Two other developers have contributed to the code base: Xavier Renard and Uwe Ebel. Xavier has focused on LDIF imports/exports and Samba software integration. Uwe has focused on internationalizing the application.

In Spring of 2005, Deon George took over maintenance of phpLDAPadmin.

Due to a long period starting from 2016, where no new pull requests have been merged into the master project, and no further releases were made, several forks exist, that implement new compatibilities and functionality. Since spring 2019 new development is going on and many pull requests were merged into the project restoring compatibility with recent PHP releases.

== Distributions ==
The following Linux distributions include phpLDAPadmin in their official software repositories:

- Ubuntu
- Debian
- Gentoo Linux
- Arch Linux

It is available in the Extra Packages for Enterprise Linux (EPEL) repository, allowing managed installation to distributions such as Red Hat Enterprise Linux, Fedora, CentOS and Scientific Linux, and is included in the M23 software distribution system, which manages and distributes software for the Debian, Ubuntu, Kubuntu, Xubuntu, Linux Mint, Fedora, CentOS and openSUSE distributions.

It is also available in repositories for FreeBSD, OpenBSD, and Solaris.
