= ForgeRock =

American information technology company

ForgeRock, Inc.
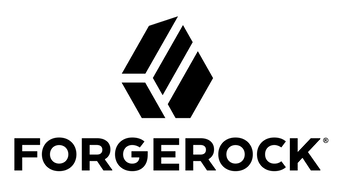
- Type: Private
- Traded as: NYSE: FORG (2021–2023)
- Industry: Enterprise software
- Founded: February 2010; 16 years ago in Norway
- Founders: Lasse Andresen; Steve Ferris; Jonathan Scudder; Victor Ake; Hermann Svoren
- Defunct: August 23, 2023
- Fate: merged into Ping Identity
- Headquarters: Providian Financial Building, San Francisco, California, United States
- Area served: Worldwide
- Key people: Fran Rosch (CEO); John Fernandez (CFO); Eve Maler (CTO)
- Products: ForgeRock Identity Platform
- Revenue: ▲US$218 million (2022)
- Operating income: ▼US$−67 million (2022)
- Net income: ▼US$−66 million (2022)
- Total assets: ▼US$494 million (2022)
- Total equity: ▼US$316 million (2022)
- Owner: Thoma Bravo
- Number of employees: 923 (December 2022)
- Website: forgerock.com

ForgeRock, Inc. was an identity and access management software company headquartered in San Francisco. On August 23, 2023, Thoma Bravo announced that it had completed the acquisition of the company for approximately $2.3 billion. On acquisition completion, ForgeRock merged into Ping Identity, with ForgeRock's technology incorporated into the Ping Identity platform.

== Overview ==
ForgeRock was founded in Norway in February 2010 by a group of former Sun Microsystems employees, after Sun was acquired by Oracle Corporation. After the acquisition, the software was scheduled for phase-out in favor of Oracle’s in-house product, so the founders "started their own company to fork the code and continue developing Sun’s software."

In April 2020, ForgeRock announced that it has raised $93.5 million in funding, a Series E it will use to continue expanding, which "brings the total raised by the company to $230 million." The company went public in September 2021. It is listed on the New York Stock Exchange under the ticker symbol FORG. On October 11, 2022, private equity firm, Thoma Bravo, agreed to purchase ForgeRock for $2.3 billion in an all-cash deal. After the acquisition was completed in August 2023, the new owner reported that ForgeRock would be integrated into its company portfolio Ping Identity.

== Products ==
The ForgeRock Identity Platform includes Access Management (based on the OpenAM open source project), Identity Management (based on the OpenIDM open source project), Directory Services (based on the OpenDJ open source project), and Identity Gateway (based on the OpenIG open source project). ForgeRock Access Management provides access management, ForgeRock Directory Services is an LDAP directory service, ForgeRock Identity Management is used for identity management, and ForgeRock Identity Gateway provides an identity gateway for web traffic and application programming interfaces (APIs).

Originally based on open source software owned by Sun Microsystems (now Oracle Corporation), the enterprise version of the ForgeRock Identity Platform can only be accessed by purchasing a commercial license. The source code of the community version is publicly available under the terms of the Common Development and Distribution License.

== See also ==
- Customer identity access management
