= LDAP Data Interchange Format =

Standard plain text data interchange format

LDIF
- Filename extension: .ldif
- Internet media type: text/plain, text/x-ldif
- Type of format: Data interchange
- Standard: RFC 2849

The LDAP Data Interchange Format (LDIF) is a standard plain text data interchange format for representing Lightweight Directory Access Protocol (LDAP) directory content and update requests. LDIF conveys directory content as a set of records, one record for each object (or entry). It also represents update requests, such as Add, Modify, Delete, and Rename, as a set of records, one record for each update request.

LDIF was designed in the early 1990s by Tim Howes, Mark C. Smith, and Gordon Good while at the University of Michigan. LDIF was updated and extended in the late 1990s for use with Version 3 of LDAP. This later version of LDIF is called version 1 and is formally specified in RFC 2849, an IETF Standard Track RFC. RFC 2849 is authored by Gordon Good and was published in June 2000. It is currently a Proposed Standard.

A number of extensions to LDIF have been proposed over the years. One extension has been formally specified by the IETF and published. RFC 4525, authored by Kurt Zeilenga, extended LDIF to support the LDAP Modify-Increment extension. It is expected that additional extensions will be published by the IETF in the future.

== Content record format ==
Each content record is represented as a group of attributes, with records separated from one another by blank lines. The individual attributes of a record are represented as single logical lines (represented as one or more multiple physical lines via a line-folding mechanism), comprising "name: value" pairs. Value data that do not fit within a portable subset of ASCII characters are marked with '::' after the attribute name and encoded into ASCII using base64 encoding. Comments can be added beginning the line by a pound-sign ("#", ASCII 35).

== Tools that employ LDIF ==
The OpenLDAP utilities include tools for exporting data from LDAP servers to LDIF content records (ldapsearch), importing data from LDIF content records to LDAP servers (ldapadd), and applying LDIF change records to LDAP servers (ldapmodify).

LDIF is one of the formats for importing and exporting address book data that the address books in Netscape Communicator and in the Mozilla Application Suite support.

Microsoft Windows 2000 Server and Windows Server 2003 include an LDIF based command line tool named LDIFDE for importing and exporting information in Active Directory.

JXplorer is a cross platform open source java application that can browse and do basic editing of LDIF files.

== LDIF fields ==
dn
distinguished name
This refers to the name that uniquely identifies an entry in the directory.
dc
domain component
This refers to each component of the domain. For example www.mydomain.com would be written as DC=www,DC=mydomain,DC=com
ou
organisational unit
This refers to the organisational unit (or sometimes the user group) that the user is part of. If the user is part of more than one group, you may specify as such, e.g., OU= Lawyer,OU= Judge.
cn
common name
This refers to the individual object (person's name; meeting room; recipe name; job title; etc.) for whom/which you are querying.

== Examples of LDIF ==
This is an example of a simple directory entry with several attributes, represented as a record in LDIF:

# Add a directory "The Postmaster"
dn: cn=The Postmaster,dc=example,dc=com
objectClass: organisationalRole
cn: The Postmaster

This is an example of an LDIF record that modifies multiple single-valued attributes for two different directory entries (this format is used by Microsoft's LDIFDE tool):

dn: CN=John Smith,OU=Legal,DC=example,DC=com
changetype: modify
replace: employeeID
employeeID: 1234
-
replace: employeeNumber
employeeNumber: 98722
-
replace: extensionAttribute6
extensionAttribute6: JSmith98
-

dn: CN=Jane Smith,OU=Accounting,DC=example,DC=com
changetype: modify
replace: employeeID
employeeID: 5678
-
replace: employeeNumber
employeeNumber: 76543
-
replace: extensionAttribute6
extensionAttribute6: JSmith14
-

Note: the "-" character between each attribute change is required. Also note that each directory entry ends with a "-" followed by a blank line. The final "-" is required by Microsoft's LDIFDE tool, but not needed by most ldif implementations.

This is an example of an LDIF file that adds a telephone number to an existing user:

dn: cn=Peter Michaels, ou=Artists, l=San Francisco, c=US
changetype: modify
add: telephonenumber
telephonenumber: +1 415 555 0002

An example of LDIF containing a control:

version: 1
dn: o=testing,dc=example,dc=com
control: 1.3.6.1.1.13.1 false cn
changetype: add
objectClass: top
objectClass: organisation
o: testing

== RFCs ==
- RFC 2849 — The LDAP Data Interchange Format (LDIF) - Technical Specification
- RFC 4510 — Lightweight Directory Access Protocol (LDAP): Technical Specification Road Map
- RFC 4525 — LDAP Modify-Increment Extension
