= NetIQ eDirectory =

Directory service software

- Developer: NetIQ (OpenText)
- Stable release: 24.4 (9.3) / May 2025
- Operating system: Cross-platform
- Type: Directory service
- License: Proprietary
- Website: https://www.netiq.com/products/edirectory/

eDirectory is an X.500-compatible directory service software product from NetIQ. Previously owned by Novell, the product has also been known as Novell Directory Services (NDS) and sometimes referred to as NetWare Directory Services. NDS was initially released by Novell in 1993 for Netware 4, replacing the Netware bindery mechanism used in previous versions, for centrally managing access to resources on multiple servers and computers within a given network. eDirectory is a hierarchical, object oriented database used to represent certain assets in an organization in a logical tree, including organizations, organizational units, people, positions, servers, volumes, workstations, applications, printers, services, and groups to name just a few.

== Features ==
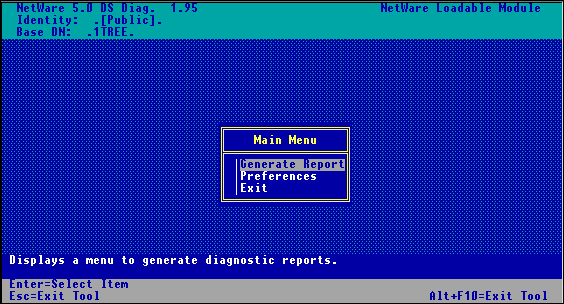
NetWare eDirectory CWorthy Management Tool

eDirectory uses dynamic rights inheritance, which allows both global and specific access controls. Access rights to objects in the tree are determined at the time of the request and are determined by the rights assigned to the objects by virtue of their location in the tree, any security equivalences, and individual assignments. The software supports partitioning at any point in the tree, as well as replication of any partition to any number of servers. Replication between servers occurs periodically using deltas of the objects. Each server can act as a master of the information it holds (provided the replica is not read only). Additionally, replicas may be filtered to only include defined attributes to increase speed (for example, a replica may be configured to only include a name and phone number for use in a corporate address book, as opposed to the entire directory user profile).

The software supports referential integrity, multi-master replication, and has a modular authentication architecture. It can be accessed via LDAP, DSML, SOAP, ODBC, JDBC, JNDI, and ADSI.

== Supported platforms ==
- Microsoft Windows Server
- SUSE Linux Enterprise Server
- Red Hat Enterprise Linux
- Novell NetWare
- Sun Solaris
- IBM AIX
- HP-UX

== Network configuration stored in the directory ==
Novell stores a large amount of network and server configuration data within eDirectory. In this example, the server name is "ADMIN1". Shown is an organizational unit, user groups, print queues, disk volumes, the server itself, print servers, Novell licensing, user template, secure authentication service, encryption key pairs, service location protocol, LDAP server, DNS configuration, DHCP configuration, Bordermanager server config, Novell installation service, SNMP config

When Novell first designed their directory, they decided to store large amounts of their operational server data within the directory in addition to just user account information. As a result, a typical Novell directory contains a large pool of additional objects representing the servers themselves and any software services running on those servers, such as LDAP or email software.

== Storage ==
Versions of eDirectory prior to version 8 (then called Novell Directory Services) used a record-based database management engine called Recman, which relied on the Transaction Tracking System built into the NetWare operating system. Since version 8, eDirectory (along with the GroupWise collaboration suite, starting with version 5) uses the FLAIM (FLexible Adaptable Information Management) database engine. FLAIM is an open source embeddable database engine developed by Novell and released under the GPL license in 2006. This change allowed for it to be ported to other platforms such as Windows, Linux, and Unix.

== See also ==
- List of LDAP software
