= 389 Directory Server =

LDAP server software

- Developer: Red Hat
- Initial release: December 8, 2005; 20 years ago
- Stable release: 3.1.2 / January 23, 2025; 14 months ago
- Written in: C, Python, Perl
- Operating system: Linux / Unix
- Type: Directory server
- License: GPL
- Website: www.port389.org
- Repository: github.com/389ds/389-ds-base

The 389 Directory Server (previously Fedora Directory Server) is a Lightweight Directory Access Protocol (LDAP) server developed by Red Hat as part of the community-supported Fedora Project. The name "389" derives from the port number used by LDAP.

389 Directory Server supports many operating systems, including Fedora Linux, Red Hat Enterprise Linux, Debian, Solaris, and HP-UX 11i. In late 2016 the project merged experimental FreeBSD support. However, the 389 Directory Server team, as of 2017, is likely to remove HPUX and Solaris support in the upcoming 1.4.x series.

The 389 source code is generally available under the GNU General Public License version 3; some components have an exception for plugin code, while other components use LGPLv2 or Apache. Red Hat also markets a commercial version of the project as Red Hat Directory Server as part of support contracts for RHEL.

== History ==
In 1996, the developers of the University of Michigan SLAPD project were hired by Netscape Communications Corporation. The codebase was forked, and became known as the Netscape Directory Server (NDS). After acquiring Netscape, America Online sold ownership of the NDS intellectual property to Sun Microsystems, but retained rights akin to ownership. Sun later developed and sold their own version of the server under the name Sun ONE Directory Server, as part of the Java Enterprise System; with the transfer of property in the acquisition of Sun Microsystems, Oracle Corporation retained the code under development by Sun, where it became Oracle Directory Server. AOL's rights were then later acquired by Red Hat, and on June 1, 2005, much of the original source code of the project prior to Sun's development was released as free software under the terms of the GNU General Public License (GPL).

As of 389 Directory Server version 1.0 (December 1, 2005), Red Hat released as free software all the remaining source code for all components included in the release package (admin server, console, etc.) and continues to maintain them under their respective licenses.

In May 2009, the Fedora Directory Server project changed its name to 389 to give the project a distribution- and vendor-neutral name and encourage porting or running the software on other operating systems.

== Features ==
389 Directory server is a rfc4511 compliant server. The project has a focus on ease of use, stability, correctness, and performance.

=== Supported RFCs ===
This is a subset of the RFCs that 389 Directory Server supports.

RFC	Description
1274	COSINE and x.500 schema
2222	Simple Authentication and Security Layer
2830	Lightweight Directory Access Protocol (v3): Extension for Transport Layer Security (StartTLS)
4527	Read Entry Controls

=== Non RFC Features ===
In addition to supported RFCS, 389 Directory Server supports a number of features unique to the project.

Name of feature	Description
MemberOf	MemberOf provides reverse group links from group members
Class of Service	Apply virtual attributes from a template to entries
Distributed Numeric Assignment	Automatically create uidNumber/gidNumber from server id allocations
Multimaster Replication	Allows multiple writeable masters to asynchronously replicate data
Autoscaling	The server automatically scales up and down based on hardware size

== See also ==
- List of LDAP software
