= Directory Services Markup Language =

Directory Services Markup Language (DSML) is a representation of directory service information in an XML syntax.

The DSML version 1 effort was announced on July 12, 1999 by creator Bowstreet (subsequently acquired by IBM in 2005). Initiative supporters include AOL-Netscape, Sun Microsystems, Oracle, Novell, Microsoft, and IBM. It resulted in a Document Type Definition for a file containing the XML representation of entries in the LDAP data model, similar in spirit to LDIF. The DSML version 2 effort was promulgated in OASIS in 2001. It resulted in an XML schema for the representation of directory access operations based on that of LDAP, that could be carried in SOAP.

The Service Provisioning Markup Language (SPML) also from OASIS is based on the concepts of DSMLv2, but does not have such a tight coupling to the LDAP information model.

DSML is often pronounced "dismal".

== Example of DSML result from requesting an LDAP directory ==
<?xml version="1.0" encoding="UTF-8"?>
<batchResponse xmlns="urn:oasis:names:tc:DSML:2:0:core">
  <searchResponse>
      <searchResultEntry dn="uid=misterX,ou=People,dc=dsml,dc=sample">
      <attr name="objectClass">
        <value>person</value>
        <value>organizationalPerson</value>
        <value>inetOrgPerson</value>
        <value>top</value>
      </attr>
      <attr name="givenName">        <value>X</value></attr>
      <attr name="title">            <value>Mr</value></attr>
      <attr name="uid">              <value>misterX</value></attr>
      <attr name="cn">               <value>X</value></attr>
      <attr name="sn">               <value>Mister</value></attr>
      <attr name="mail">             <value>misterx@...</value></attr>
      <attr name="ou">               <value>People</value></attr>
    </searchResultEntry>
    <searchResultDone>
      <resultCode code="0"/>
    </searchResultDone>
  </searchResponse>
</batchResponse>
