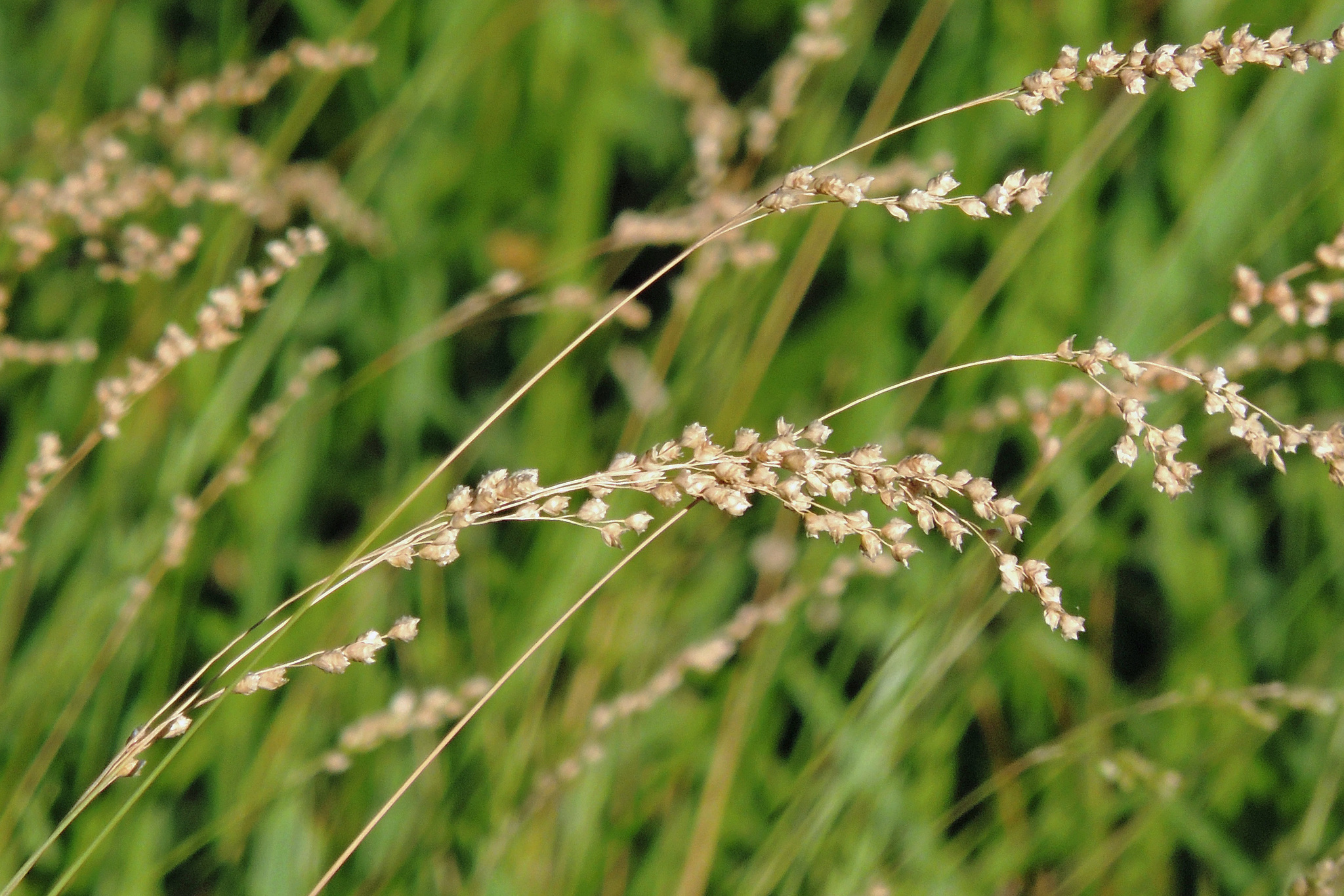
- Chascolytrum subaristatum

Scientific classification
- Kingdom: Plantae
- Clade: Tracheophytes
- Clade: Angiosperms
- Clade: Monocots
- Clade: Commelinids
- Order: Poales
- Family: Poaceae
- Subfamily: Pooideae
- Supertribe: Poodae
- Tribe: Poeae
- Subtribe: Calothecinae
- Genus: Chascolytrum; Desv.

Type species
- Chascolytrum subaristatum (Lam.) Desv.

Synonyms
- Briza sect. Chascolytrum (Desv.) Benth. & Hook.; Briza subgen. Chascolytrum (Desv.) Parodi; Cascoelytrum P.Beauv., not validly publ.; Gymnachne Parodi

= Chascolytrum =

Genus of grasses

Chascolytrum is a genus of plants in the grass family, native to Latin America from Mexico to Chile (including the Juan Fernández Islands).

== Species ==
Seven species are accepted.

- Chascolytrum altimontanum Essi, Souza-Chies & Longhi-Wagner - Bolivia
- Chascolytrum erectum (Lam.) Desv. - Brazil, Paraguay, Uruguay, Argentina
- Chascolytrum lamarckianum (Nees) Matthei - Brazil, Uruguay, Argentina
- Chascolytrum neobulbosum Funez – southern Brazil (Santa Catarina)
- Chascolytrum paleapiliferum (Parodi) Matthei - northern Argentina
- Chascolytrum scabrum (Nees ex Steud.) Matthei - southern Brazil
- Chascolytrum subaristatum (Lam.) Desv. - Mexico, Guatemala, Colombia, Peru, Bolivia, Chile (including the Juan Fernández Islands), Argentina, Paraguay, southern Brazil, Uruguay; naturalised in Cape Province and in New South Wales

=== Formerly placed here ===
Many species formerly placed in genus Chascolytrum are now placed in separate genera within subtribe Calothecinae.

- Boldrinia parodiana (Roseng., B.R.Arrill. & Izag.) L.N.Silva (as Chascolytrum parodianum (Roseng., B.R.Arrill. & Izag.) Matthei)
- Calotheca brizoides (Lam.) P.Beauv. (as Chascolytrum brizoides (Lam.) Essi, Longhi-Wagner & Souza-Chies)
- Erianthecium bulbosum Parodi (as Chascolytrum bulbosum (Parodi) Essi, Longhi-Wagner & Souza-Chies)
- Lombardochloa rufa (J.Presl) Roseng. & B.R.Arrill. (as Chascolytrum rufum J.Presl in C.B.Presl)
- Microbriza brachychaete (Ekman) Parodi ex Nicora & Rúgolo (as Chascolytrum brachychaete (Ekman) Essi, Longhi-Wagner & Souza-Chies)
- Microbriza poomorpha (J.Presl) Parodi ex Nicora & Rúgolo (as Chascolytrum poomorphum (J.Presl) Essi, Longhi-Wagner & Souza-Chies)
- Neesiochloa barbata (Nees) Pilg. (as Chascolytrum barbatum (Nees) Kunth)
- Poidium ambiguum (Hack.) Matthei (as Chascolytrum ambiguum (Hack.) Essi, Longhi-Wagner & Souza-Chies)
- Poidium brasiliense Nees (as Chascolytrum brasiliense (Nees) Essi, Longhi-Wagner & Souza-Chies)
- Poidium calotheca (Trin.) Matthei (as Chascolytrum calotheca (Trin.) Essi, Longhi-Wagner & Souza-Chies)
- Poidium itatiaiae (Ekman) Nicora & Rúgolo (as Chascolytrum itatiaiae (Ekman) Essi, Longhi-Wagner & Souza-Chies)
- Poidium juergensii (Hack.) Matthei (as Chascolytrum juergensii (Hack.) Essi, Souza-Chies & Longhi-Wagner)
- Poidium latifolium (Essi, Souza-Chies & Longhi-Wagner) L.N.Silva (as Chascolytrum latifolium Essi, Souza-Chies & Longhi-Wagner)
- Poidium uniolae (Nees) Matthei (as Chascolytrum uniolae (Nees) Essi, Longhi-Wagner & Souza-Chies)
- Rhombolytrum koelerioides (Trin.) L.N.Silva (as Chascolytrum koelerioides (Trin.) Essi, Longhi-Wagner & Souza-Chies)
- Rhombolytrum monandrum (Hack.) Nicora & Rúgolo (as Chascolytrum bidentatum (Roseng., B.R.Arrill. & Izag.) Essi, Longhi-Wagner & Souza-Chies)
- Rhombolytrum rhomboideum Link (as Chascolytrum rhomboideum (Link) Essi, Longhi-Wagner & Souza-Chies)
- Rosengurttia monandra (Hack.) L.N.Silva (as Chascolytrum monandrum (Hack.) Essi, Longhi-Wagner & Souza-Chies)

== See also ==
- List of Poaceae genera
