= Arrillaga =

Arrillaga is a surname. Notable people include:

- Blanca Renée Arrillaga (1917–2011), Uruguayan chemist, botanist, professor and agrostologist
- Eduardo Arrillaga (born 1961), Mexican rower
- John Arrillaga (1937–2022), American real estate billionaire
- José Joaquín de Arrillaga, seventh (1792–1794) and tenth (1800–1814) governor of Alta California
- Laura Arrillaga-Andreessen, American philanthropist, daughter of John
- Maria Arrillaga, Puerto Rican poet
