= Marc Andreessen =

American businessman (born 1971)

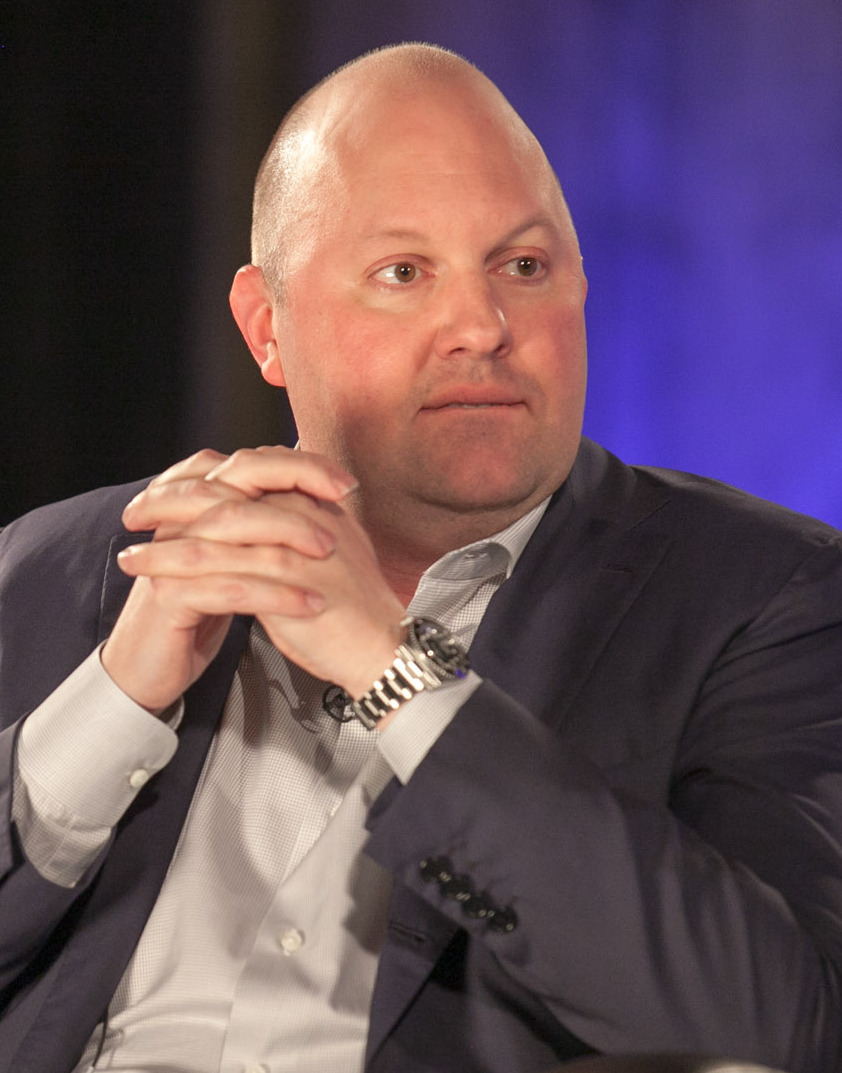
- Andreessen in 2013
- Born: Marc Lowell Andreessen; July 9, 1971 (age 55); Cedar Falls, Iowa, U.S.
- Education: University of Illinois Urbana-Champaign (BS)
- Occupations: Investor; entrepreneur; software engineer
- Known for: Mosaic; Netscape; Opsware; Andreessen Horowitz
- Spouse: Laura Arrillaga (m. 2006)
- Children: John
- Relatives: John Arrillaga (father-in-law)
- Website: a16z.com/author/marc-andreessen

Marc Lowell Andreessen (/ænˈdriːsən/ an-DREE-sən; born July 9, 1971) is an American businessman, venture capitalist, and former software engineer. He is the co-author of Mosaic, the first web browser to display inline images; co-founder of Netscape; and co-founder and general partner of Silicon Valley venture capital firm Andreessen Horowitz.

He co-founded and later sold the software company Opsware to Hewlett-Packard; he also co-founded Ning, a company that provides a platform for social networking websites. In 2024, he became an advisor to Donald Trump.

As of November 2026, Forbes estimated Andreessen's net worth at US$18.5 billion.

== Early life and education ==
Andreessen was born in Cedar Falls, Iowa, and raised in New Lisbon, Wisconsin, which he considered "the sticks". He is the son of Patricia, customer service operator at Lands' End, and Lowell Andreessen, who worked as a sales manager for the seed producer Pioneer Hi-Bred International. He has a younger brother named Jeff. Andreessen has stated that he had problematic relationships with his parents and brother, and that he did not like to talk about them.

Andreessen discovered programming at age 12. In December 1993, Andreessen received his bachelor's degree in computer science from the University of Illinois at Urbana–Champaign (UIUC). As an undergraduate, he interned twice at IBM in Austin, Texas. He worked in the AIX graphics software development group responsible for the MIT X implementation and ports of the 3D language APIs: SGI's Graphics Language (GL) and PHIGS. He also worked as a programmer, earning $6.85 per hour (equivalent of $15.49/hr in 2026), at the National Center for Supercomputing Applications (NCSA) at the University of Illinois. At that time, he became familiar with Tim Berners-Lee's open standards for the World Wide Web, but the World Wide Web browser required advanced programming skills to use.

After being shown the graphic web browser ViolaWWW in late 1992, Andreessen and full-time salaried co-worker Eric Bina worked on creating a browser with integrated graphics that could be ported to a wide range of computers, including Windows. The result was the Mosaic web browser released in 1993. The new web browser led to a 342,000 percent increase in web traffic in a year. Before Mosaic, there had only been 50 websites on the Web, but the number now increased to 10,000, while the percentage of internet users who surfed the Web increased from 1% to 25%.

In the Web's first generation, Tim Berners-Lee launched the Uniform Resource Locator (URL), Hypertext Transfer Protocol (HTTP), and HTML standards with prototype Unix-based servers and browsers. A few people noticed that the Web might be better than Gopher. In the second generation, Marc Andreessen and Eric Bina developed NCSA Mosaic at the University of Illinois. Several million then suddenly noticed that the Web might be better than sex.

— Bob Metcalfe, InfoWorld, August 21, 1995, Vol. 17, Issue 34.

Mosaic is often referred to as the first successful web browser. It was also the first browser widely used for both Windows and Mac.

The NCSA though refused to give the Mosaic team credit for their contribution, so Andreessen, disillusioned, decided to leave the center in 1994.

== Career ==
=== Netscape ===
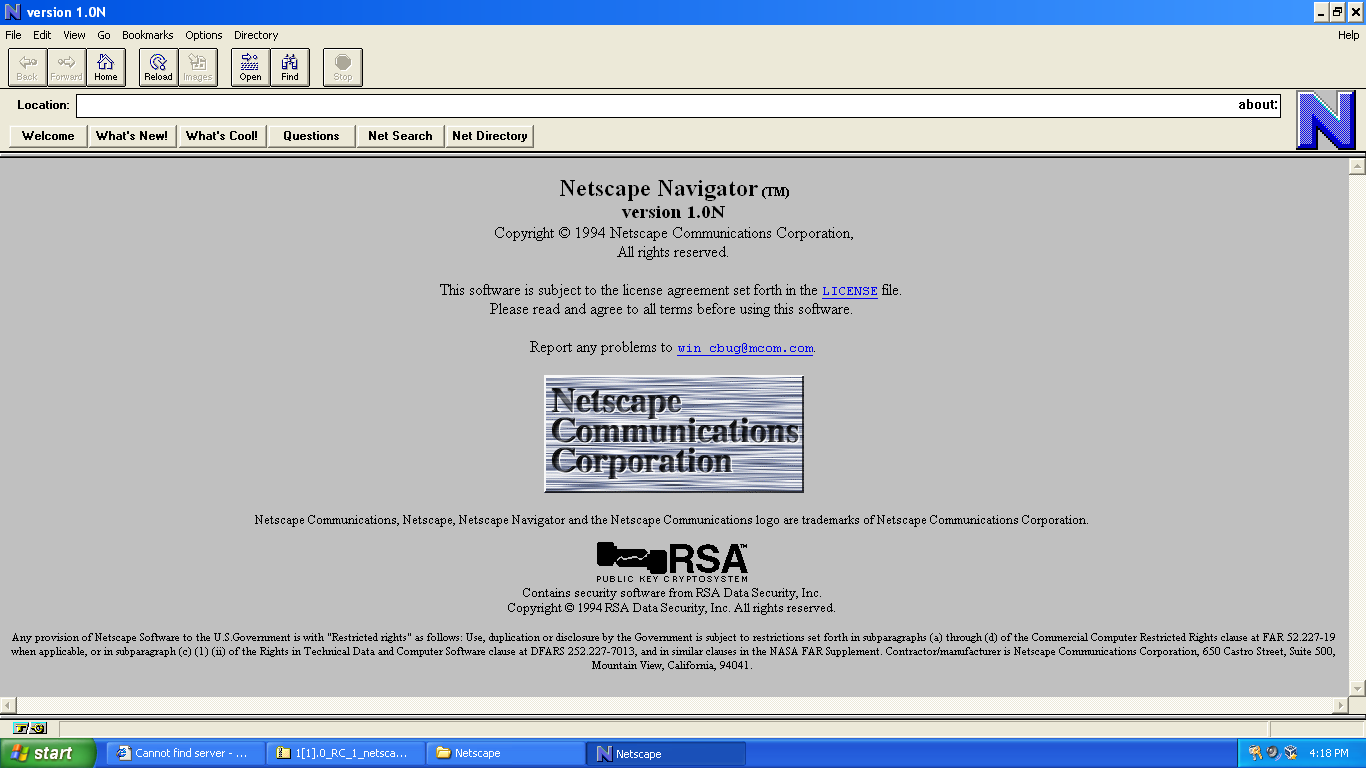
Netscape 1.0 "Network release"

After graduating from the University of Illinois Urbana-Champaign in 1993, Andreessen moved to California to work at Enterprise Integration Technologies. Andreessen then met with Jim Clark, the founder of Silicon Graphics, who had recently exited the firm. Clark believed the Mosaic browser had great commercial possibilities and suggested starting an Internet software company. Soon, Mosaic Communications Corporation was in business in Mountain View, California, with Andreessen as co-founder and vice president of technology. The University of Illinois was unhappy with the company's use of the Mosaic name, so Mosaic Communications changed its name to Netscape Communications, and its flagship Web browser was named Netscape Navigator. Netscape was the first successful commercial web browser (offered for free). It offers a wide variety of clients, servers, development tools and e-commerce applications. It also simplified the interface, increased speed and provided tools to support financial transactions in comparison with its predecessor Mosaic.

Netscape's IPO in 1995 put Andreessen in the public eye. He was on the cover of Time and other publications.

Netscape was acquired in 1999 for $4.3 billion by AOL. Andreessen's hiring as its chief technical officer was contingent on the completion of the acquisition. The same year, he was named to the MIT Technology Review TR100 as one of the top 100 innovators in the world under the age of 35.

=== Opsware ===
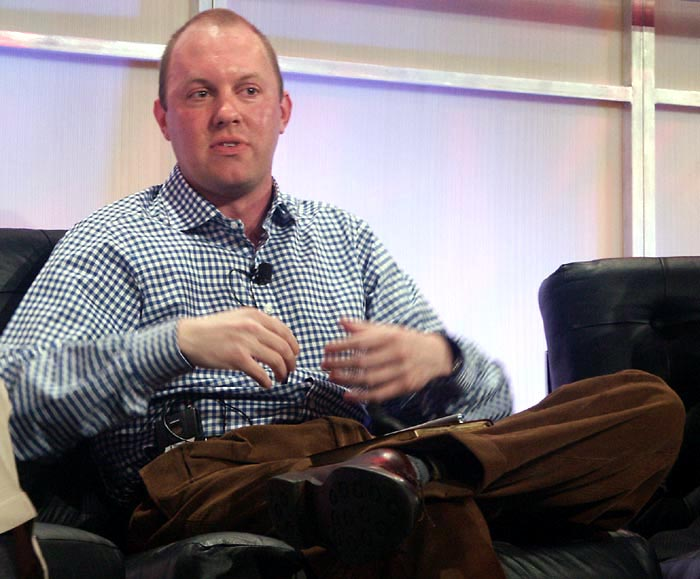
Andreessen in 2004

After AOL acquired Netscape in late 1998, Andreessen founded Opsware with Ben Horowitz, Tim Howes, and In Sik Rhee. Originally named Loudcloud, the company provided computing, hosting and software services to consumer-facing internet and e-commerce companies. Loudcloud sold its hosting business to EDS and changed its name to Opsware in 2003, with Andreessen serving as chairman. Acquired by Hewlett-Packard for $1.6 billion in 2007, it was one of the first companies to offer software as a service and to attempt cloud hosting.

=== Andreessen Horowitz ===
Between 2005 and 2009, Andreessen and Horowitz separately and together invested $4 million in 45 startups, including Twitter and Qik. The two became well known as super angel investors. On July 6, 2009, Andreessen and Horowitz announced their Silicon Valley venture-capital firm Andreessen Horowitz.

Andreessen Horowitz began with an initial capitalization of $300 million; within three years the firm grew to $2.7 billion under management across three funds. In 2012, Andreessen Horowitz's portfolio holdings included Facebook, Foursquare, GitHub, Pinterest, Twitter and Honor Technology. In 2021, Business Insider notes that successful IPOs that have cemented Andreessen Horowitz's reputation include Okta, Inc., PagerDuty, Pinterest, Accolade, Slack Technologies, Lyft, DigitalOcean and Coinbase.

Both Andreessen and the firm have an interest in cryptocurrency. In 2021, the firm launched a $2.2 billion crypto-focused fund, which was followed by a 2022 $4.5 billion fund dedicated to crypto and blockchain. Notable crypto and NFT startups in its portfolio include Alchemy, Dapper Labs, Avalanche, OpenSea, Solana and Yuga Labs.

In 2023, the firm launched the American Dynamism fund, which focuses on hard tech sectors which serve national interest, including space, defense, manufacturing, robotics. The fund has backed companies like the defense manufacturing startup Hadrian and the hypersonic long-range rocket startup Castelion. In 2024, Andreessen Horowitz launched the 12-month American Dynamism Engineering Fellows Program, which was intended to recruit and train technologists. Also associated with the American Dynamism fund is the annual American Dynamism summit sponsored by Andreessen Horowitz, which gathers startup founders, investors, Members of Congress and Defense Department officials. The summit is officially non-partisan and has partnered with Democratic defense officials like former Deputy Secretary of Defense Kathleen Hicks.

On September 1, 2009, an investor group that included Andreessen Horowitz acquired a majority stake in Skype at a valuation of $2.75 billion, which was considered risky. The deal paid off in May 2011 when Microsoft bought Skype for $8.5 billion. In 2010, the firm assisted Silicon Valley attorney Ted Wang in creating the first free standardized seed round financing documents, the Series Seed Documents.

Andreessen joined the eBay board of directors in 2008 and served on it for six years. In October 2014, he announced his resignation from the board due to the company's decision to break off its online payments unit PayPal. The decision to cut ties with PayPal was a point of contention between Andreessen and investor Carl Icahn. Icahn advocated for the PayPal split while Andreessen opposed the spin-off, resulting in public disputes. Andreessen was accused by Icahn of putting his own interests in front of what was best for shareholders. Icahn published his argument in an open letter that detailed alleged conflicts of interest in eBay's 2009 sale of Skype to a group of private investors, which included Andreessen's firm.

The fund is active in Europe. Despite this, in January 2025, after Donald Trump's election, Andreessen Horowitz closed its London office (its first office in Europe, led by general partner Sriram Krishnan) to pivot back to the crypto market in the U.S. Nevertheless, it has also been developing a strong scout network in Europe, with a focus on AI startups. The fund has invested in the French unicorn Mistral AI, the German AI image generation startup Black Forest Labs and Berlin-based automation platform unicorn n8n, the UK's metaverse unicorn Improbable and insurtech startup Hyperexponential.

In July 2025, Andreessen Horowitz led the largest seed round in history for AI startup Thinking Machines Lab, which raised a record $2 billion, valuing the firm at $12 billion.

The New Yorker's Tad Friend remarks that Andreessen and Horowitz's leadership styles complement each other, with Andreessen being the visionary chairman while Horowitz is the people-person CEO.

=== Other roles and business ventures ===
Andreessen cofounded and chaired Ning, the third company he established, after Netscape and Loudcloud. In September 2011, it was announced that Ning had been sold to Mode Media for a reported price of $150 million. Andreessen joined Glam Media's board of directors after the sale.

According to Business Insider, Andreessen "has contributed personally to more than two dozen fund managers and VCs, based on interviews with investors and fund announcements, ranging from Lucy Guo's Backend Capital to Packy McCormick's Not Boring Capital and Ryan Hoover's Weekend Fund. Andreessen's portfolio includes a number of funds started by alumni of his eponymous firm, such as Zal Bilimoria, Li Jin, and Kathryn Haun" (not counting funds he backs indirectly through Andreessen Horowitz).

Andreessen has backed Brianne Kimmel's Worklife Ventures, which focuses B2B products and promotes inclusive working environment, as well as Sarah Cone's environment-focused Social Impact Capital (the latter with Peter Thiel, a16z's Chris Dixon and David Sacks).

In 2009, together with Peter Thiel, Andreessen helped Aydin Senkut to start the first institutional fundraise for his Felicis Ventures, after the latter's former Google colleagues had rejected his attempts to help with funding "almost unanimously".

Andreessen has backed Narya Capital, which is associated with J.D. Vance, together with Peter Thiel and Eric Schmidt.

Andreessen backs Anti Fund together with Chris Dixon.

He is a personal investor in companies including LinkedIn and boutique bank Raine.

He has also invested in funds tied to conservative causes such as New Founding, which is described as a "pro-American, Christian" venture capital fund or the "anti-woke" 1789 Capital, which aims to build a "parallel economy" (both as personal investments).

Andreessen has invested in multiple special economic zones including California Forever in northern California, Próspera off the coast of Honduras, and Praxis in an as yet to be announced location. He has also invested in Pronomos Capital, which is funding multiple special economic zone projects across the world. These special economic zones have been linked by various sources to the Network State movement.

Andreessen serves on the board of Meta, Hewlett Packard Enterprise, Kno, Stanford Hospital, Bump Technologies, Anki, Oculus VR, OpenGov, Dialpad, and TinyCo. Hewlett Packard Enterprise announced in February 2018 that board member Andreessen would not seek reelection at the 2018 Annual Meeting of Stockholders on April 4. In his time at Hewlett Packard, Andreessen had been partially blamed for some of the company's failures, including the recruiting of Léo Apotheker as well as the acquisitions of Autonomy and Palm.

Andreessen advises the leaders of companies in which Andreessen Horowitz invests, including Mark Zuckerberg of Facebook and Mark Pincus of Zynga. For example, he is advisor to Asana and director of CollabNet. He is a proponent of Bitcoin. Andreessen is on an advisory board for Neom, the Saudi Arabian government's plan to build a futuristic megacity in the desert.

In 2026, Andreessen was appointed to the President's Council of Advisors on Science and Technology (PCAST) by President Donald Trump.

=== Writings ===
In 2011, Andreessen published a Wall Street Journal essay and corresponding blog titled “Why Software Is Eating the World”, which, according to Fortune in 2026, accurately predicted the shift of retail and entertainment services to software platforms, citing the growth of companies like Amazon, Spotify, and Netflix.

In April 2020, early in the COVID-19 pandemic, Andreessen published an opinion article, "It's time to build", describing the United States' COVID-19 response and suggesting technological and cultural solutions to the problem.

In October 2023, Andreessen published a "Techno-Optimist Manifesto" arguing that civilization is built on technology and that "Technology is the glory of human ambition and achievement, the spearhead of progress, and the realization of our potential." He has also described himself as a "tescrealist".

Thinkers who have been noted to inform his writings include the German sociologist Robert Michels, Friedrich Nietzsche, and the Italian writer Filippo Tommaso Marinetti, who was the founder of Futurism and co-author of the Fascist manifesto.

=== Awards and accolades ===
Andreessen and Horowitz were ranked No. 6 on Vanity Fair's 2011 New Establishment List, no. 1 on CNET's 2011 most influential investors list and Nos. 2 and 21, respectively, on the 2012 Forbes Midas List of Tech's Top Investors.

In 2012, Andreessen was named in the Time 100, an annual list of the 100 most influential people in the world assembled by Time. His essay "Software is eating the world" has been influential and widely cited.

In 2013, Andreessen was one of five Internet and Web pioneers awarded the inaugural Queen Elizabeth Prize for Engineering.

Andreessen was one of six inductees in the World Wide Web Hall of Fame announced at the First International Conference on the World-Wide Web in 1994.

=== Influence in tech ===
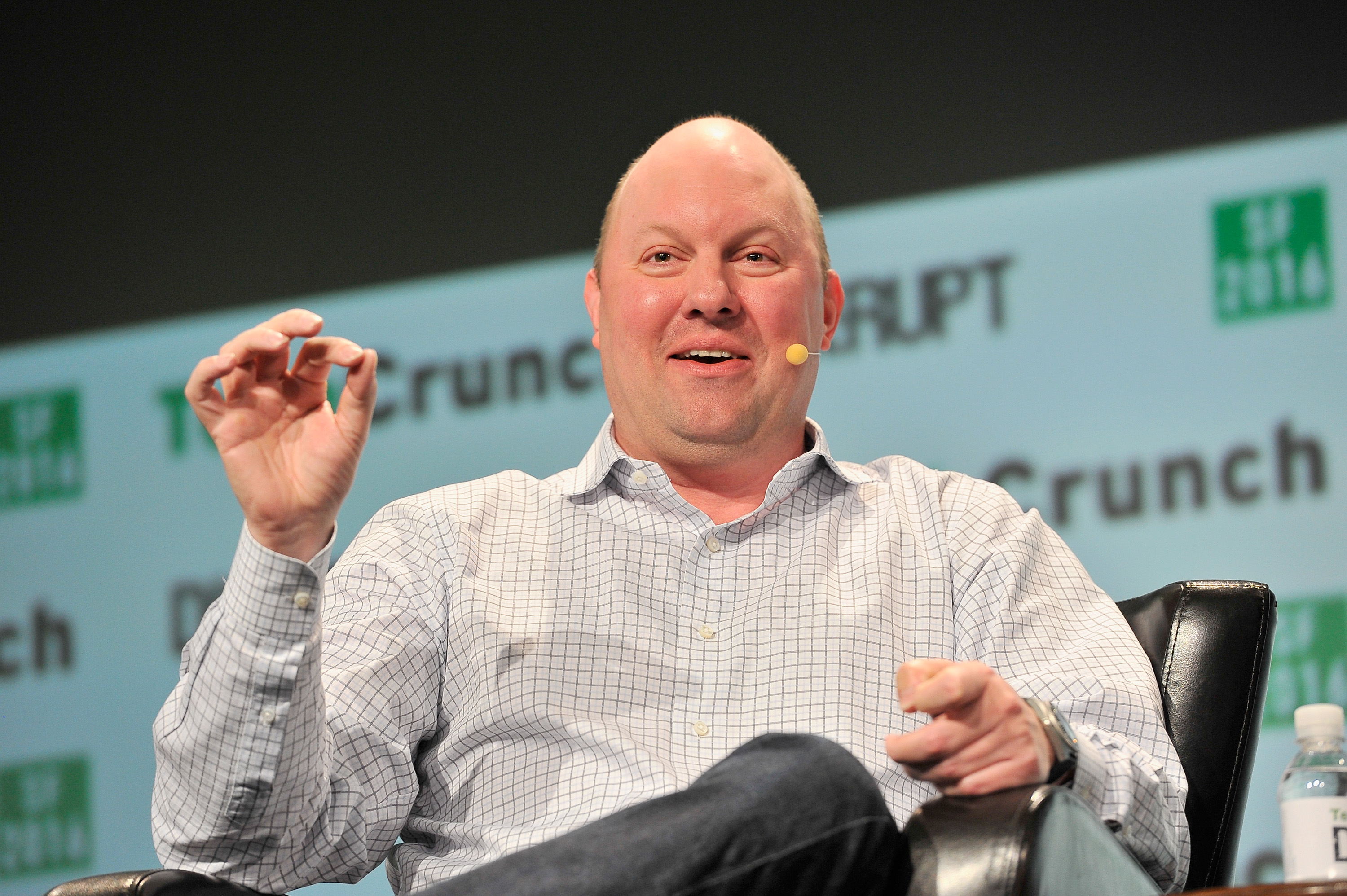
Marc Andreessen speaks onstage during TechCrunch Disrupt SF 2016 at Pier 48 on September 13, 2016, in San Francisco, California.

In April 2012, Andreessen and Andreessen Horowitz General Partners Ben Horowitz, Peter Levine, Jeff Jordan, John O'Farrell, and Scott Weiss pledged to donate half their lifetime incomes from venture capital to charitable organizations.

Andrew Keen remarks that "more than any other single individual, Andreessen was responsible for transforming the nonprofit Internet into a winner-take-all economy". One of Andreessen's recognizable decisions was to make hyperlinks appear in blue and visited links in purple in the NCSA Mosaic web browser, a change that was implemented around 1993. This choice, while seemingly simple, had a profound impact on the development of the World Wide Web. The blue hyperlink became a standard convention, allowing users to easily identify clickable text and navigate the burgeoning online world. This intuitive design choice contributed significantly to the widespread adoption of the web and remains a fundamental element of web design to this day. Andreessen has publicly explained his reasoning for the color choice, noting in an interview that he simply "liked blue" and needed a color that would stand out on the original gray background of the browser, along with purple being visually distinct for visited links.

Andreessen, alongside Peter Thiel and Eric Schmidt, are often considered the important tech investors in the U.S. defense industry sector. The Neue Zürcher Zeitung remarks that while Schmidt often issues warnings about the risk of the U.S. losing technological lead and Thiel emphasizes dominance over opponents, Andreessen strives for achieving peace through deterrence. His important investments in the area include Anduril Industries, Shield AI, the drone startup Skydio and the counter-drone startup Epirus.

In February 2016, in response to the Telecom Regulatory Authority of India's decision to ban Facebook's project Free Basics on the basis that it violated the country's net neutrality laws, Andreessen posted a tweet which read, "Anti-colonialism has been economically catastrophic for the Indian people for decades. Why stop now?" Andreessen later deleted the tweet following criticism from Indians and non-Indians alike. Facebook spent millions advertising Free Basics to the Indian public. The project failed due to violations, setting preferential tariffs in accessing content and setting up a "walled garden" on the internet.

In April 2016, Facebook shareholders filed a class action lawsuit to block Zuckerberg's plan to create a new class of non-voting shares. The lawsuit alleges Andreessen secretly coached Zuckerberg through a process to win board approval for the stock change while Andreessen also served as an independent board member representing stockholders. According to court documents, Andreessen shared information with Zuckerberg about their progress and concerns and helped Zuckerberg negotiate against shareholders. Court documents included transcripts of private texts between Zuckerberg and Andreessen.

== Politics ==
=== Political activities ===
Andreessen endorsed and voted for Bill Clinton, Al Gore, John Kerry, Barack Obama and Hillary Clinton. In 2012, Andreessen donated $100,000 to Republican presidential candidate Mitt Romney. During the 2016 primary season, he endorsed Republican candidate Carly Fiorina, but after Fiorina dropped out of the race, Andreessen switched his endorsement to the Democratic nominee Hillary Clinton, citing the Republican nominee Donald Trump's immigration stance.

In July 2024, Andreessen announced he would donate to super PACs that support Donald Trump's 2024 presidential campaign. During the first half of 2025, Andreessen donated $3 million to MAGA Inc., a super PAC that supports Donald Trump.

Andreessen is a mega-donor to the political superPAC and pro-cryptocurrency advocacy group Fairshake. Andreessen came out against president Joe Biden's re-election bid, saying he feared higher taxes on billionaires and stricter regulations on industries he invests in (cryptocurrency and AI). On Joe Rogan's podcast in November 2024, Andreessen claimed that some cryptocurrency users have been unfairly debanked.

While not officially part of Elon Musk's DOGE, Andreessen has been listed as “a key networker for talent recruitment” at the agency, according to The Washington Post. He has also shared insight about DOGE's plans in various interviews.

Several authors note that Andreessen belongs to a small group of tech leaders who play an increasingly central role not only in the Silicon Valley, but also in the U.S. political life. German journalist Claus Kleber, author of the ZDF documentary Trump und das Silicon Valley – Staatsstreich der Tech-Oligarchen ("Trump and Silicon Valley – coup d'état of the tech oligarchs"), opines that Andreessen's power is only outmatched by that of Peter Thiel, who often works alongside him. Evgeny Morozov, writing for the Spanish El País, notes that Andreessen "reimagines money" for the government, and that the tech leaders (dubbed "oligarch-intellectuals" by Morozov) have power to turn their "interpretive gift [...] into legislative mandate".

=== Political views ===
Regarding his shift towards the Republican party, Andreessen explained that he was shocked by the Biden administration's aggressive attitude towards cryptocurrency and AI. In 2025, when interviewed by The New York Times's Ross Douthat, he recounted an occasion (in May 2024) in which he and Ben Horowitz attempted to meet with then-President Joe Biden, who declined the meeting but sent senior staff to explain the new policies, which included making sure "that A.I. is going to be a function of two or three large companies", directly regulated and controlled by the government without competition from any startup, as well as a ban on the free creation and release of code. Andreessen's claim was disputed by Sam Altman.

Andreessen also criticized elite education institutions for having radicalized children of the privileged class, teaching them to hate capitalism and start their job at his companies with the intention to destroy those companies from inside:

In other words, the young children of the privileged going to the top universities between 2008 to 2012, they basically radicalized hard at the universities, I think, primarily as a consequence of the global financial crisis and probably Iraq. Throw that in there also. But for whatever reason, they radicalized hard [...] What I now understand it to be historically is a rebirth of the New Left [...] It turned out to be a coalition of economic radicals, and this was the rise of Bernie Sanders, but the kids turned on capitalism in a very fundamental way. They came out as some version of radical Marxist, and the fundamental valence went from "Capitalism is good and an enabler of the good society" to "Capitalism is evil and should be torn down." And then the other part was social revolution and the social revolution, of course, was the Great Awokening, and then those conjoined. And there was a point where the median, newly arrived Harvard kid in 2006 was a career obsessed striver and their conversation with you was: "When do I get promoted, and how much do I get paid, and when do I end up running the company?" And that was the thing. By 2013, the median newly arrived Harvard kid was like: "[expletive] it. We're burning the system down. You are all evil. White people are evil. All men are evil. Capitalism is evil. Tech is evil."

Futurism counters Andreessen's point on elite education by showing that the political position of the average American remains stable. But Bloomberg noted that among the tech champions, the Democrats' turn to identity politics and technology-skepticism has spurred a rightward shift. Bloomberg remarked that the skepticism against new technology is based on issues such as "privacy, monopoly power and social media's effects on young people", but criticized the crackdown on crypto in particular, describing it as bringing "no discernible political benefit" as there are very few voters who are fixated on anti-crypto matters.

Andreessen has supported high-skilled immigration as a source of talent for the tech industry, but by January 2025, he said that he was reconsidering this position. He has also criticized DEI policies issued by government and institutions in multiple occasions. In a 2014 interview with New York's Kevin Roose, he questioned the need of diversity rules on ethnicities. His reasoning was that companies were so desperate for talent that they would try to get it from anywhere. He also questioned the fact White and Asian people of different ethnicities and religions were often grouped together and considered not diverse. In a 3.5h interview talk with Lex Fridman, Andreessen said that mandatory NASDAQ rules that imposed diversity criteria on corporate boards were "crazy", recounting that on one occasion he was tempted to describe himself as "bisexual" to help Meta meet those criteria, as he felt for Peter Thiel, who was horrified when Meta lawyers suggested that he classified himself as "diverse". In July 2025, the Washington Post published leaked messages Andreessen sent to top officials in the Trump administration, stating that "The combination of DEI and immigration is politically lethal [...] they systematically cut most of the children of the Trump voter base out of any realistic prospect of access to higher education and corporate America". He also named Stanford University, the Massachusetts Institute of Technology (MIT) as well as the National Science Foundation (NSF) as particular culprits, warning that these institutions "will pay the price". In a group chat, he allegedly called for the NSF to receive "the bureaucratic death penalty". Reacting to the messages, MIT's spokesperson said that, "MIT is merit-based and affordable, driven by innovation and entrepreneurship, and committed to excellence—all with a mission of national service", while Stanford refused to comment on Andreessen's characterization of the university.

== Personal life ==
Andreessen identifies himself as German-American.

Andreessen married Laura Arrillaga in 2006. She is the founder of the Silicon Valley Social Venture Fund and daughter of Silicon Valley real estate billionaire John Arrillaga. The couple met in 2005, at a New Year’s Eve dinner organized by the former eHarmony CEO. Andreessen considered Arrillaga and her father his replacement family. They got married nine months later. They have one son, who was carried by a gestational surrogate. According to Business Insider, the son was 8 years old in 2023.

In 2009, Andreessen issued a $25,000 reward for information leading to a conviction in the 1987 unsolved murder of Barbara Blackstone, a teacher from New Lisbon High School in Wisconsin, which he had attended. The case remains unsolved as of 2022.

In 2021, he and his wife bought a property in Malibu for $177 million from Serge and Florence Azria. This was the highest price paid for a California property at that time. As of February 2023, his net worth is estimated at $1.7 billion by Forbes.

In 2022, Andreessen and his wife advocated against the construction of 131 multifamily housing units in their affluent Atherton, California town. In a letter, they wrote that they opposed permitting more than one house on a single acre of land. Andreessen's comments sparked criticisms of hypocrisy, as he had previously argued for increased housing supply, in particular in California.
