= Peery =

Peery is a surname. Notable people with the surname include:

- George C. Peery (1873–1952), American Democratic politician, Governor of Virginia from 1934 to 1938
- Janet Peery (born 1948), American short story writer and novelist from Wichita, Kansas
- Nelson Peery (1923–2015), American political activist and author
- Richard Peery (born 1938/39), American billionaire real estate developer
- William Peery (1743–1800), American farmer, lawyer, and politician from Cool Spring, Delaware
- Andrew M. Peery (1865 –1906), American politician who served in the Virginia House of Delegates

== See also ==
- Barnes-Peery House, known commonly as the Barnes Mansion, one of the oldest private homes of Jefferson County, Colorado
- Peery's Egyptian Theater, movie palace in Ogden, Utah
