= Bromus brizoides =

Bromus brizoides is a taxon synonym for two species of grasses:

- Bromus brizoides Lam., a synonym of Calotheca brizoides (Lam.) P.Beauv.
- Bromus brizoides Willd. ex Steud., a synonym of Chascolytrum subaristatum (Lam.) Desv.
