= Eric Vishria =

American venture capitalist

- Born: 1979 (age 46–47)
- Education: Stanford University
- Occupation: Venture capitalist
- Employer: General Partner at Benchmark
- Known for: CEO, co-founder of Rockmelt

Eric Vishria (born 1979) is an American entrepreneur and venture capitalist . He is a general partner at Benchmark, a venture capital firm. Previously, he was CEO and co-founder of Rockmelt and served as vice president at Yahoo following Yahoo's acquisition of Rockmelt.

== Career ==
Vishria graduated from Stanford University at age 19 with a B.S. in mathematical and computational science and a minor in human biology. He began his career in investment banking at Broadview International and got his first entrepreneurial experience as an early employee at Loudcloud and later Opsware. When Opsware was acquired by Hewlett-Packard in 2007 for $1.65 billion, Vishria was serving as VP of marketing. After the acquisition, Eric became vice president of the products, software, technology solutions group in HP Software.

In October 2008, Vishria left HP to co-found RockMelt with Tim Howes, and launched the RockMelt social browser in November 2010. In 2013, RockMelt was acquired by Yahoo for a reported $60–70 million, where Vishria started working as a Yahoo VP. In 2014, Vishria joined Benchmark as a general partner, the first partner addition in over 6 years.

Vishria has led Benchmark’s investments in and holds board seats on Amplitude (which underwent an IPO in 2021), Benchling, Cerebras Systems, Confluent (IPO, 2021), Contentful, Fireworks.ai, and Quilter. Vishria’s exited investments include Pixie Labs (which was acquired by New Relic) and Bugsnag (which was acquired by SmartBear).
