= Erianthecium =

Scientific classification
- Kingdom: Plantae
- Clade: Tracheophytes
- Clade: Angiosperms
- Clade: Monocots
- Clade: Commelinids
- Order: Poales
- Family: Poaceae
- Subfamily: Pooideae
- Tribe: Poeae
- Subtribe: Calothecinae
- Genus: Erianthecium; Parodi
- Species: E. bulbosum

Binomial name
- Erianthecium bulbosum Parodi

Synonyms
- Chascolytrum bulbosum (Parodi) Essi, Longhi-Wagner & Souza-Chies

Genus of grasses

Erianthecium is a genus of grasses. It includes a single species, Erianthecium bulbosum, a perennial native to southern Brazil and Uruguay.

== Bibliography ==
- Forzza, R. C. 2010. Lista de espécies Flora do Brasil http://floradobrasil.jbrj.gov.br/2010. Jardim Botânico do Rio de Janeiro, Rio de Janeiro.
- Longhi-Wagner, H. M. 1987. Gramineae. Tribo Poeae, in Fl. Ilust. Rio Grande do Sul. Bol. Inst. Bioci. Univ. Fed. Rio Grande do Sul 41: 1–191.
- Rosengurtt, B., B. R. A. Maffei & P. I. Artucio. 1970. Gram. Urug. [i–vii], 1–489. Universidad de la República, Montevideo.
- Soreng, R. J. 2003. Erianthecium. In Catalogue of New World Grasses (Poaceae): IV. Subfamily Pooideae. Contr. U.S. Natl. Herb. 48: 312. View in BotanicusView in Biodiversity Heritage Library
- Zuloaga, F. O., O. N. Morrone, M. J. Belgrano, C. Marticorena & E. Marchesi. (eds.) 2008. Catálogo de las plantas vasculares del Cono Sur. Monogr. Syst. Bot. Missouri Bot. Gard. 107: 3 Vols., 3348 p.
