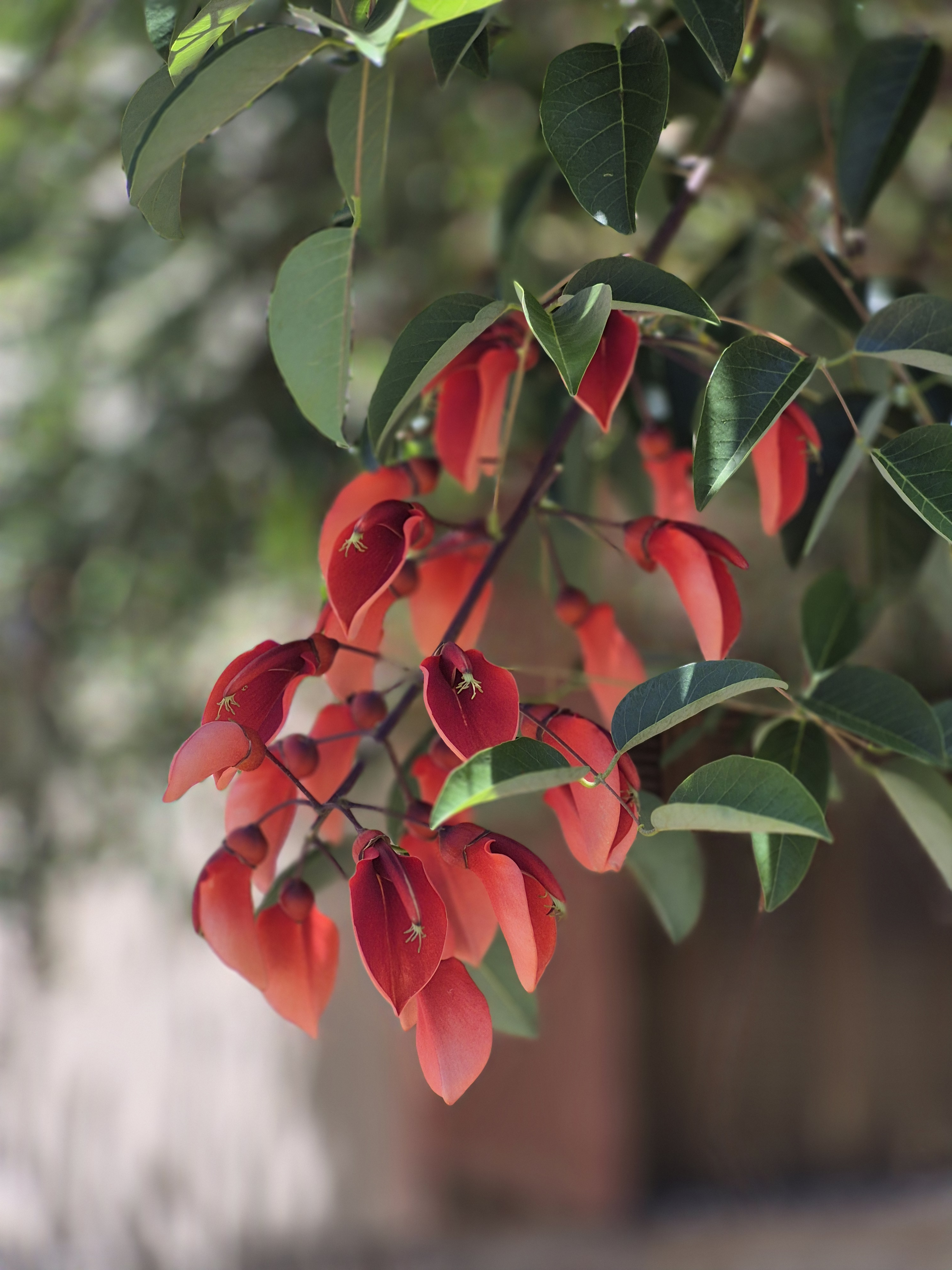

Conservation status
- Least Concern (IUCN 3.1)

- Apparently Secure (NatureServe)

Scientific classification
- Kingdom: Plantae
- Clade: Tracheophytes
- Clade: Angiosperms
- Clade: Eudicots
- Clade: Rosids
- Order: Fabales
- Family: Fabaceae
- Subfamily: Faboideae
- Genus: Erythrina
- Species: E. crista-galli

Binomial name
- Erythrina crista-galli L.

Synonyms
- List: Corallodendron crista-galli (L.) Kuntze; Erythrina crista-galli L. var. hasskarlii Backer; Erythrina crista-galli L. var. leucochlora Lombardo; Erythrina fasciculata Benth.; Erythrina laurifolia Jacq.; Erythrina pulcherrima Tod.; Erythrina speciosa Tod. (However, E. speciosa Andrews is a distinct species.); Micropteryx crista-galli Walp.; Micropteryx fasciculata Walp.; Micropteryx laurifolia Walp.

= Erythrina crista-galli =

Species of legume

Erythrina crista-galli, also known as the cockspur coral tree, ceibo (in Spanish) or corticeira (in Portuguese), is a species of flowering tree in the family Fabaceae, native to Argentina, Uruguay, Bolivia, southern Brazil and Paraguay. It is widely planted as a street or garden tree in other countries, notably in California. Its specific epithet crista-galli means "cock's comb" in Latin.

It is the national tree of Argentina, and its flower the national flower of Argentina and Uruguay.

== Description ==
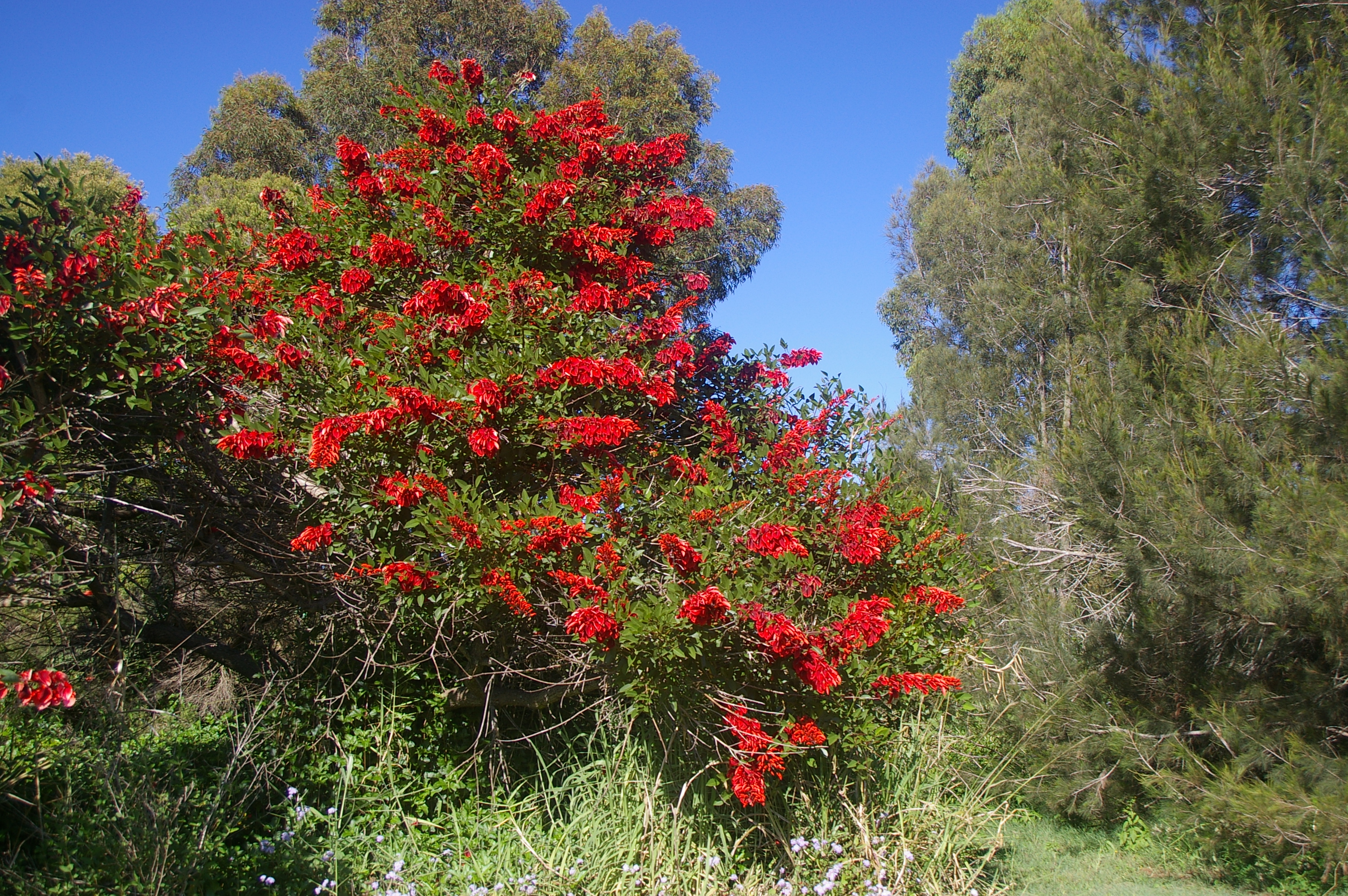
A tree blooming in Brisbane, Australia

Erythrina crista-galli is a small tree, the girth of its trunk measuring 50 cm (20 in). Normally it grows 5–8 m (16–26 ft) tall, although some individuals, such as in the Argentine provinces of Salta, Jujuy and Tucumán, can grow up to 10 m (33 ft). The woody trunk of the tree is equipped with irregular and thorny branches and can reach 50 cm in circumference. These branches form a layer without definite form and die after flowering.

The root is a taproot with nodules produced by nitrogen-fixing bacteria. The bacteria live in symbiosis with the tree, facilitating the tree's absorption of nitrogen in return for organic substances which the bacteria need.

=== Flowers and fruit ===
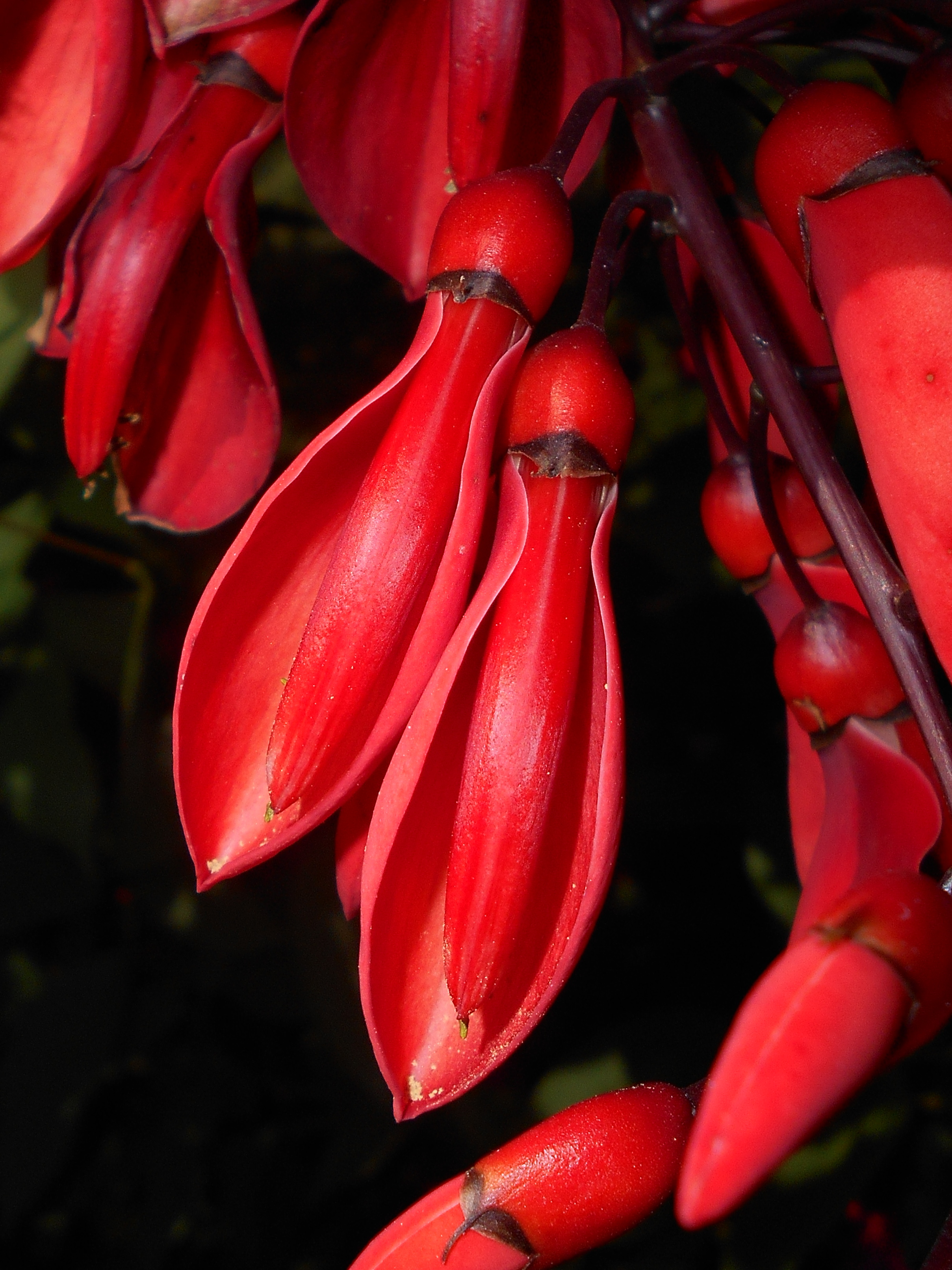
Flowers

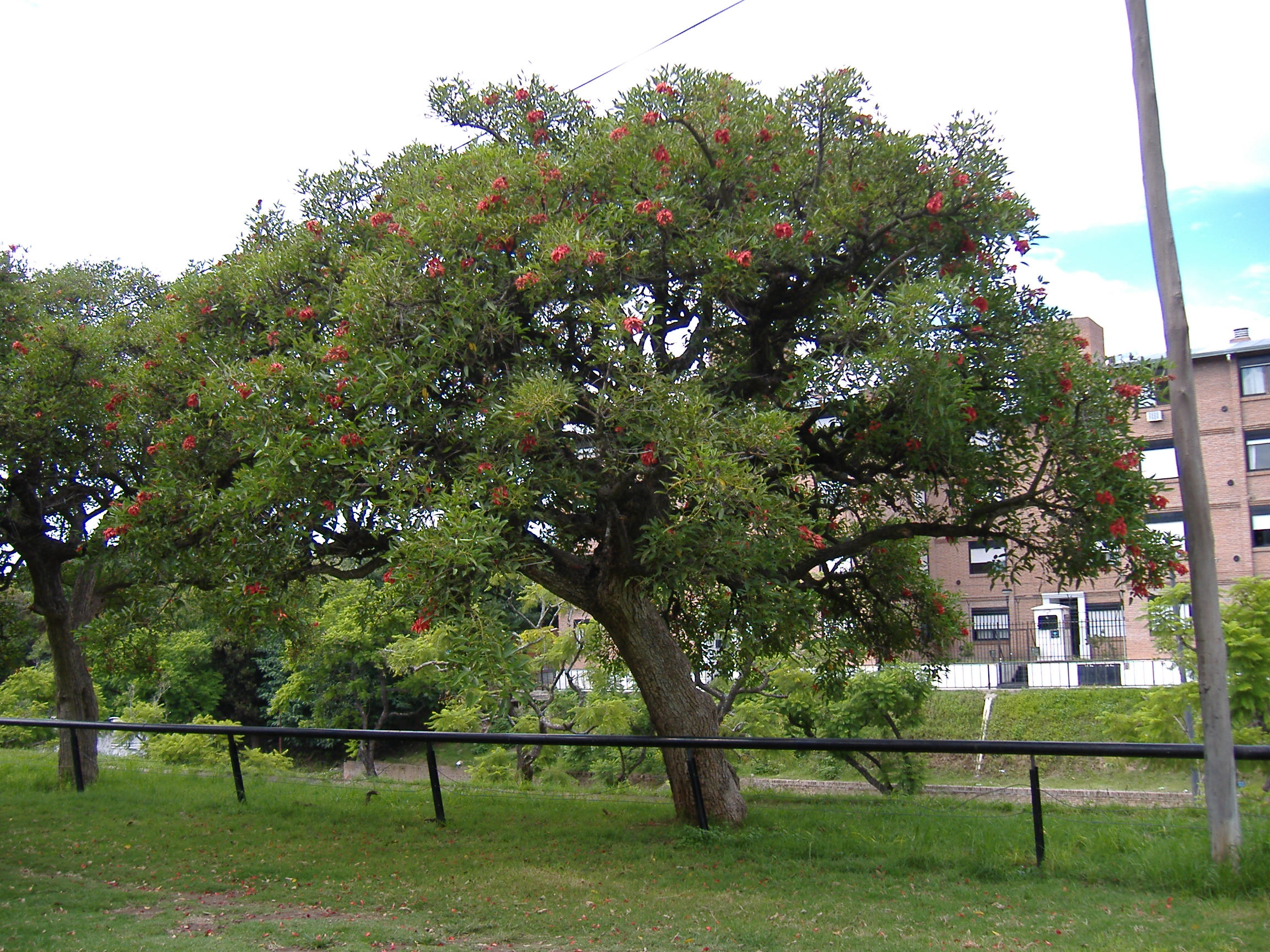
A tree in an urban park in Rosario, Argentina

The red flower, arranged in inflorescences of the raceme type, is pentameric, complete, and of bilateral symmetry. Its calyx is gamosepalous, like a little red thimble. The corolla, like that of other legumes like common beans, is butterfly-shaped; however, the largest petal, called the "standard", is arranged in the lower part. The two petals called "wings" are so small that they are practically hidden within the calyx. The remaining two petals partially fuse together on occasion and form the flower's keel or "carina"; this protects its reproductive organs. The androecium consists of ten stamens, one free and nine united by their filaments (gynostemial androecium). The unicarpel gynoecium is welded between the stamens like a knife in its sheath.

The tree flowers in the summer, from October to April in their native South America and from April to October in the northern hemisphere.

The flowers are rich in nectar and are visited by insects, which usually have to crawl underneath the carina and thus pollinate the flowers.

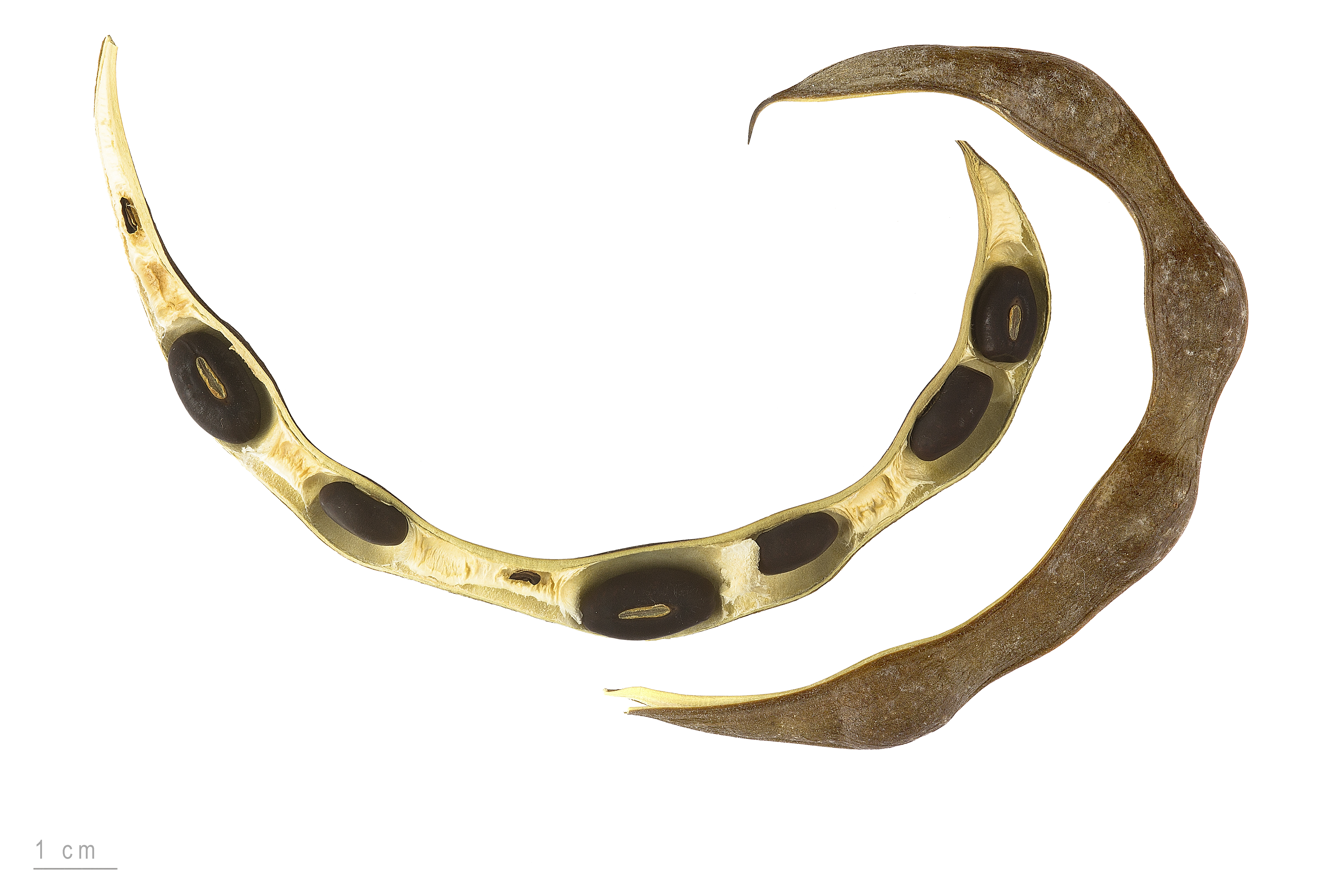
Seeds

The tree's fruit is a legume, a dry pod a few centimeters in length derived from a single carpel and contains about 8–10 chestnut-brown bean-shaped seeds. The cotyledons are hypogeal, staying underground upon germination.

== Cultivation ==
In cultivation in the United Kingdom this plant has gained the Royal Horticultural Society's Award of Garden Merit. In urban settings, it is often planted in parks for its bright red flowers.

== Distribution ==
It is distributed throughout northeastern and central western Argentina, eastern Bolivia, southern Brazil, much of Paraguay, and almost all of Uruguay. It lives in low, flood-prone places, and along the watercourses of the Chaco and the Eastern Region. It does not inhabit high forests or dry places without floods, as it tolerates water-saturated soils very well.

This species characteristically grows wild in gallery forest ecosystems along watercourses, as well as in swamps and wetlands.

It is naturalised in parts of Australia where it is a declared weed in some areas.

== Uses ==
It has dyeing and medicinal applications: its bark is used to treat rheumatism wounds and serves as a diuretic antispasmodic; its resin can cure intestinal diseases; Its leaves contain camphor, that helps wound healing and has anti-inflammatory properties for tumors.
