= Series Seed Documents =

Created by Ted Wang and Marc Andreessen in 2010, the Series Seed Documents are a set of standardized legal documents used to help startups capitol from investors.

== History ==
Ted Wang and Marc Andreessen who were partners at Fenwick & West published the Series Seed Documents in 2010 to help lower the costs and barriers for startups to obtain funding. An appeal of these documents is their simplicity and open source license.
