= Rockmelt =

Chromium-based web browser

- Rockmelt 0.8.36.116 displaying Wikipedia on Windows 7
- Developers: Tim Howes, Eric Vishria
- Final release: 2.2 / May 15, 2014; 12 years ago
- Engine: WebKit (based on KHTML)
- Operating system: Android, iOS, Windows
- Type: Social media web browser
- License: Freeware
- Website: rockmelt.com (archived on April 2, 2013)

Rockmelt is a discontinued proprietary social media web browser developed by Tim Howes and Eric Vishria based on the Google Chromium project, incorporating social media features such as Facebook chat, Twitter notifications and widgetised areas for other content providers such as YouTube and local newspapers. The Rockmelt web browser project was backed by Netscape founder Marc Andreessen. In April 2013, Rockmelt discontinued its desktop web browser, replacing it with a collaborative project bringing together social elements from various sources.

Rockmelt was created by Rockmelt, Inc., located in Mountain View, California. The final version, 2.2.0, was released on February 9, 2013.

On August 2, 2013, Yahoo! acquired Rockmelt. Rockmelt apps and its website were shut down after August 31, 2013. Yahoo! said in a statement that it planned to repurpose Rockmelt's software for use in various existing products.

== History ==
- November 7, 2010 – Rockmelt for PC and Mac launches in private beta
- March 11, 2011 – Rockmelt for PC and Mac launches in open beta
- April 19, 2011 – Rockmelt for iPhone launches
- October 11, 2012 – Rockmelt for iPad launches
- December 20, 2012 – a new Rockmelt for iPhone launches
- April 11, 2013 – Rockmelt for Web launches
- June 19, 2013 – Rockmelt for Android launches
- June 27, 2013 – Rockmelt for Windows launches
- August 2, 2013 – Rockmelt is acquired by Yahoo
- August 31, 2013 – Rockmelt mobile applications pulled off of web

== Reception ==
Rockmelt was positively received by Tom's Guide, though they noticed that the RAM consumption was higher than Chrome or Firefox. The browser's "Edges" were called "the three most prominent features of the RockMelt browser".

Notebook Review, while comparing Rockmelt to Flock, gave Rockmelt 4.5 stars out of 5, with the absence of extension support being the most noticeable issue with the browser. "The social networking integration is worlds better than Flock's, and ... there are at least some very useful features that RockMelt leverages. The news feed really is well done, and the Facebook handling is certainly better than Flock."

In a beta preview by Techcrunch, Rockmelt received mixed reviews mostly due to the browser using Chromium as its base, with a number of concerns whether the browser would find its audience.

In a short review by PCWorld, Megan Geuss stressed the overall Facebook integration of the browsers, which would not work for every user, while also praising the performance of Rockmelt: "the fledgling browser works really quickly. It did an even better job than Chrome at processing HTML5".

A PCMech review of Rockmelt stressed how easy it was to share content via Rockmelt, and the browser received praises for the option to add additional feeds. "It is easier than manually going to Twitter or Facebook and is most certainly easier when managing feeds for the web sites you visit often. On top of that, it looks good."
