= Condilorachia =

Scientific classification
- Kingdom: Plantae
- Clade: Tracheophytes
- Clade: Angiosperms
- Clade: Monocots
- Clade: Commelinids
- Order: Poales
- Family: Poaceae
- Subfamily: Pooideae
- Tribe: Poeae
- Subtribe: Calothecinae
- Genus: Condilorachia; P.M.Peterson, Romasch. & Soreng

Genus of grasses

Condilorachia is a genus of grasses. It includes three species native to southeastern and southern Brazil, northeastern Argentina, and central Chile.

- Condilorachia brasiliensis (Louis-Marie) P.M.Peterson, Romasch. & Soreng
- Condilorachia bulbosa (Hitchc.) P.M.Peterson, Romasch. & Soreng
- Condilorachia juergensii (Hack.) P.M.Peterson, Romasch. & Soreng
