= Poidium =

Scientific classification
- Kingdom: Plantae
- Clade: Tracheophytes
- Clade: Angiosperms
- Clade: Monocots
- Clade: Commelinids
- Order: Poales
- Family: Poaceae
- Subfamily: Pooideae
- Tribe: Poeae
- Subtribe: Calothecinae
- Genus: Poidium; Nees

Genus of grasses

Poidium is a genus of grasses. It includes eight species native to South America, including Colombia, Bolivia, southern and southeastern Brazil, Paraguay, Uruguay, and Argentina.

== Species ==
Eight species are accepted.

- Poidium ambiguum (Hack.) Matthei
- Poidium brasiliense Nees
- Poidium calotheca (Trin.) Matthei
- Poidium itatiaiae (Ekman) Nicora & Rúgolo
- Poidium juergensii (Hack.) Matthei
- Poidium latifolium (Essi, Souza-Chies & Longhi-Wagner) L.N.Silva
- Poidium serranum (L.N.Silva) L.N.Silva
- Poidium uniolae (Nees) Matthei
