= Rhombolytrum =

Scientific classification
- Kingdom: Plantae
- Clade: Tracheophytes
- Clade: Angiosperms
- Clade: Monocots
- Clade: Commelinids
- Order: Poales
- Family: Poaceae
- Subfamily: Pooideae
- Tribe: Poeae
- Subtribe: Calothecinae
- Genus: Rhombolytrum; Link

Genus of grasses

Rhombolytrum is a genus of grasses. It includes three species native to southern Brazil and Uruguay and central and southern Chile.

- Rhombolytrum koelerioides (Trin.) L.N.Silva
- Rhombolytrum monandrum (Hack.) Nicora & Rúgolo
- Rhombolytrum rhomboideum Link
