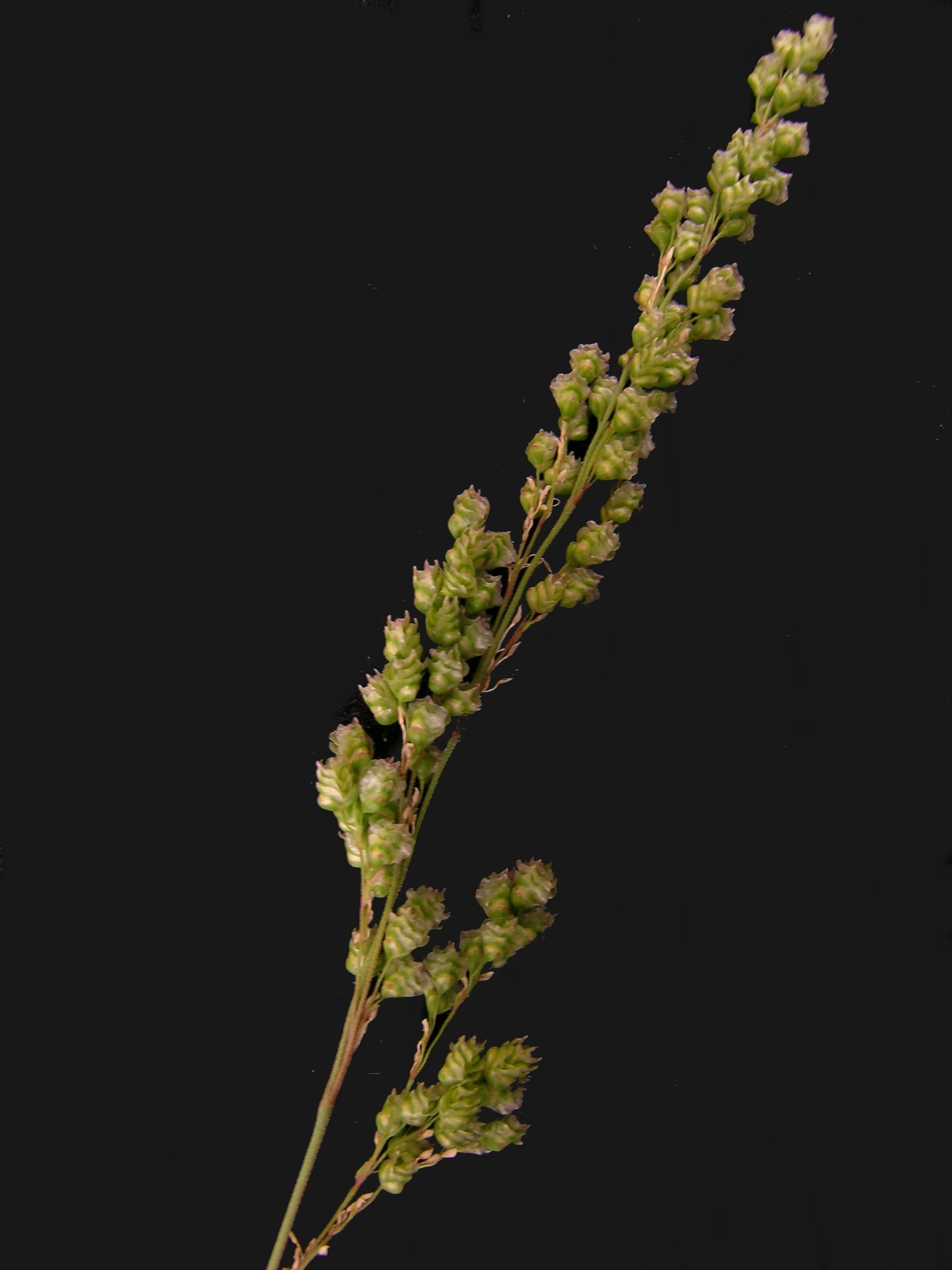

Scientific classification
- Kingdom: Plantae
- Clade: Tracheophytes
- Clade: Angiosperms
- Clade: Monocots
- Clade: Commelinids
- Order: Poales
- Family: Poaceae
- Subfamily: Pooideae
- Tribe: Poeae
- Subtribe: Calothecinae
- Genus: Chascolytrum
- Species: C. subaristatum

Binomial name
- Chascolytrum subaristatum (Lam.) Desv.

Synonyms
- Synonymy: Festuca commersonii Spreng., nom. superfl.; Briza auriculata Trevir.; Briza erecta var. parviflora Döll; Briza microstachya (J.Presl) Steud.; Briza nutans Lindl. ex Steud.; Briza poiformis (Spreng.) Kuntze; Briza reniformis (J.Presl) Steud.; Briza rotundata (Kunth) Steud.; Briza sellowii Nees ex Steud.; Briza stricta (Hook. & Arn.) Steud.; Briza subaristata Lam. (1791) (basionym); Briza subaristata var. interrupta (Hack.) Roseng.; Briza triloba Nees; Briza triloba var. grandiflora Döll; Briza triloba var. interrupta Hack.; Briza triloba f. pumila Hack. ex Kneuck.; Briza triloba f. violacea Hack.; Briza triloba f. violascens Hack.; Briza violascens Steud.; Bromus brizoides Willd. ex Steud., pro syn.; Bromus rotundatus Kunth; Calotheca microstachya J.Presl; Calotheca poiformis Spreng.; Calotheca reniformis J.Presl; Calotheca rotundata (Kunth) Roem. & Schult.; Calotheca stricta Hook. & Arn.; Calotheca triloba (Nees) Kunth; Chascolytrum coarctatum Phil.; Chascolytrum nutans Lindl. & Nees; Chascolytrum rotundatum (Kunth) Kunth; Chascolytrum strictum (Hook. & Arn.) É.Desv.; Chascolytrum trilobum (Nees) Nees

= Chascolytrum subaristatum =

Species of grass

Chascolytrum subaristatum is a species of grass. It is a perennial which ranges from northeastern Mexico to Guatemala, and in the Andes of South America from Colombia to southern Argentina and southern Chile.
