= Tim Howes =

American computer scientist (born 1963)

- Born: Timothy Alan Howes; September 21, 1963 (age 63); Ann Arbor, Michigan, United States
- Education: University of Michigan
- Known for: Co-creator of LDAP; Co-founder of Opsware; Co-founder of Rockmelt; Co-founder of Know Yourself
- Spouse: Nancy Howes (m. 2000)
- Children: Zhi Howes (B. 2004) Madeline Howes (B. 2006)

Tim Howes (born September 21, 1963) is a software engineer, entrepreneur and author. He is the co-creator of the Lightweight Directory Access Protocol (LDAP), the Internet standard for accessing directory servers. He co-founded enterprise software company Opsware, web browser company Rockmelt, and children's education company, Know Yourself. He has co-authored two books, several Internet RFCs, and holds several patents. He co-founded and currently serves as CTO for Palona AI: building High EQ, fully customizable AI Agents for businesses that learn about each individual customer and adapt to their needs.

== Education and Lightweight Directory Access Protocol ==
Howes was born and raised in Ann Arbor, Michigan. He holds a Bachelor of Science degree in Aerospace Engineering, a Master of Science in Computer Science and Engineering and a Ph.D. in Computer Science and Engineering, all from the University of Michigan.

While at the University of Michigan, Howes was tasked with creating a campus-wide directory service using the X.500 standard. X.500 directories list network resources to make finding them and using them easier for network administrators and users. Unfortunately, accessing X.500 records has required a full-blown X.500 server; there was no such thing as an X.500 client. This led Howes to co-create DIXIE, a directory client for X.500 directories (as well as contribute significant enhancements to improve performance of the Quipu directory). This work formed the basis of his Ph.D. dissertation and was the foundation for LDAP, a standards-based version of DIXIE for both clients and servers. The first publicly available version of LDAP was published in 1993.

== Career ==
=== Netscape ===
In 1996, after joining Netscape as directory server architect, Howes was named one of the Top 25 Network Technology Drivers by Network Computing magazine. In 1997, LDAP version 3 won PC Magazine's Technical Excellence: Networking award. Howes was also named a Netscape Fellow, Netscape's highest engineering honor, and was promoted to chief technology officer of Netscape's Server Products Division.

=== Loudcloud and Opsware ===
In 1999, shortly after AOL acquired Netscape, Howes left AOL to co-found Loudcloud with Marc Andreessen, Ben Horowitz and In Sik Rhee. Howes ran the engineering department and spearheaded the creation of Opsware, the company's data center automation software to speed-build sites. He was recognized by InfoWorld in 2000 as one of the top 10 e-business innovators. In 2002, Loudcloud shifted businesses and was renamed Opsware. At Loudcloud & Opsware, Howes held the positions of Executive Vice President and CTO. In 2005, Howes was named a "Top 25 CTO's of 2005" by InfoWorld magazine. In 2007 Opsware was acquired by Hewlett-Packard for $1.65 billion, and Howes became vice president and CTO of HP Software.

=== Rockmelt ===
In October 2008, Howes left Hewlett-Packard to co-found RockMelt with Eric Vishria. In August 2013, Rockmelt was acquired by Yahoo, and Howes joined Yahoo! as Vice President of Engineering for Yahoo's Mobile and Emerging Products Group. He left the company in December, 2014.

=== Know Yourself ===
In 2012, Howes co-founded Know Yourself, a public benefit corporation based in Oakland, California, dedicated to making self literacy a vital part of early education. The company designs and sells products that teach kids about their anatomy, physiology, and psychology, including activity kits, books, comics, and various apparel and lifestyle products.

=== ClearStory Data ===
In May 2015, Howes was named Chief Technology Officer for ClearStory Data, a leading cloud-based provider of fast-cycle data intelligence based on Apache Spark. ClearStory Data was acquired by Alteryx in April 2019.

=== Facebook ===
In November 2018, Howes joined Facebook as Director of Engineering in Facebook's AI Infrastructure group, where he worked on improving AI developer experience.

=== Palona AI ===
In late 2024, Howes co-founded Palona AI with Maria Zhang and Steven Liu. Palona AI is a suite of AI solutions that accelerate the growth of D2C and other consumer-facing businesses.

== Boards and awards ==
Howes has served on the IETF's Internet Architecture Board. He has served as a director on the boards of Blue Coat Systems and Homestead Technologies, as a member of the University of Michigan College of Engineering's National Advisory Committee, as a trustee of SFJazz, and he is technical advisor to various startups. In 2016, Howes was the recipient of the Arbor Networks PhD Research Impact Lecture and Award.

== Personal life ==
Howes lives in California.
