= John O'Farrell (venture capitalist) =

Irish venture capitalist

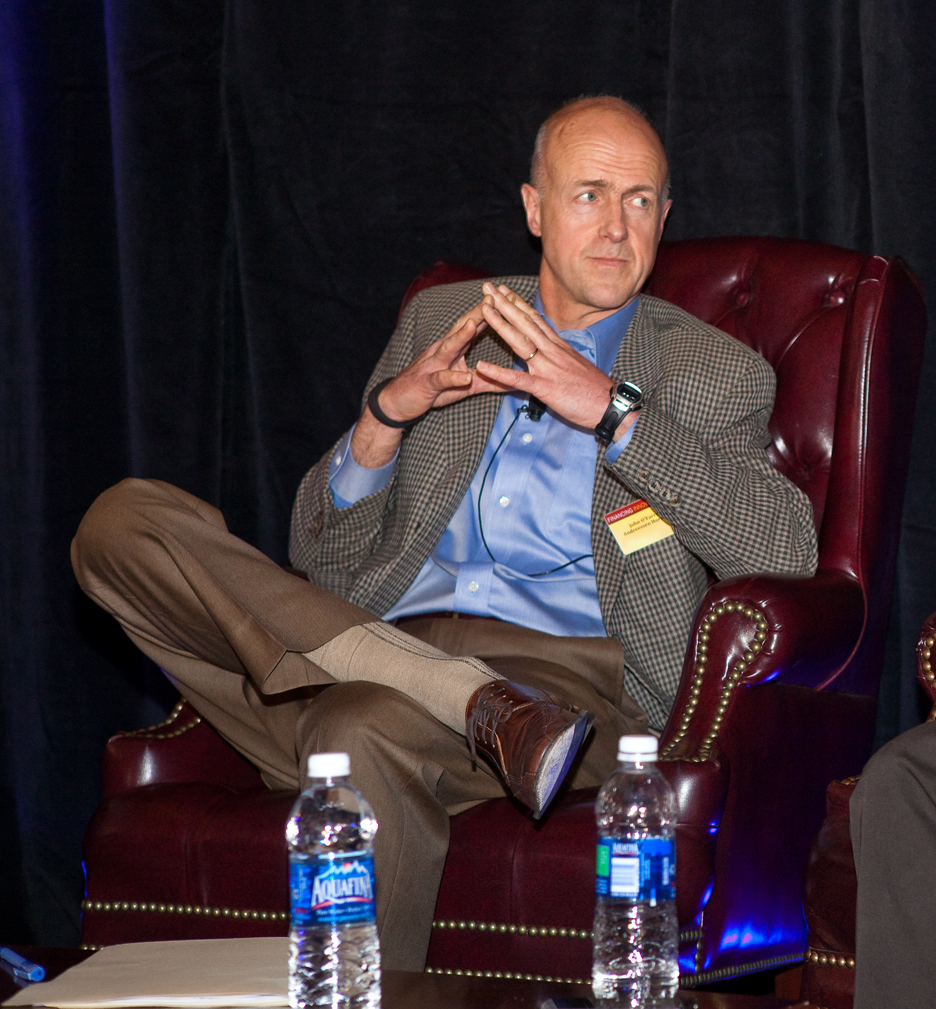
- O'Farrell in 2011
- Born: Ireland
- Education: University College Dublin (B.E.); Stanford University (MBA)
- Employer: Andreessen Horowitz
- Board member of: UNICEF USA

John O’Farrell is an Irish former venture capitalist at the Silicon Valley firm Andreessen Horowitz, which he joined in June 2010 as the first general partner hired by founders Marc Andreessen and Ben Horowitz. He resigned from the firm in May 2025. His venture capital investments included public companies Slack and PagerDuty. He was featured on the Forbes Midas List of top technology investors in 2021. He serves on the U.S. board of UNICEF.

== Early life and education ==
O'Farrell is from Stillorgan in south Dublin. Born in Ireland, O’Farrell has a Bachelor of Electronic Engineering from University College Dublin and an MBA from the Stanford Graduate School of Business, where he graduated as an Arjay Miller Scholar.

== Early career ==
From 1997 to 2001, O’Farrell was senior vice president of international for @Home Network (later Excite@Home), where he led the launch of broadband Internet services through joint venture subsidiaries in the Benelux countries, Australia and Japan. Prior to @Home, O’Farrell held general management, marketing and consulting positions in the United States and Europe with US WEST, Telecom Éireann, Booz Allen Hamilton, the European Commission, Digital Equipment Corp. and Siemens.

From 2001 to 2007, O’Farrell was executive vice president, business development, for Opsware Inc., which was initially known as Loudcloud and was one of the first companies to offer Software as a Service and cloud computing services. With CEO Ben Horowitz, O’Farrell negotiated Loudcloud's 2002 exit from the services business and its emergence as a server automation software company named Opsware with a $52 million initial contract from EDS. Over the subsequent five years, O’Farrell led the expansion of Opsware's product line into asset-management, networking, storage and runbook automation through four acquisitions as well as overseas partnerships with NEC Corp. and NTT Communications. In February 2006, O’Farrell negotiated Opsware's multi-million dollar distribution agreement with Cisco Systems, which was generating $5 million in quarterly revenue for Cisco by Q4 of that year. O’Farrell and Horowitz orchestrated a process involving 10 potential acquirers that resulted in the sale of Opsware to Hewlett-Packard for $1.65 billion in June 2007.

In his book "The Hard Thing About Hard Things", Ben Horowitz described O'Farrell as "the industry's greatest M&A negotiator" and wrote that if he had to choose one person to negotiate on his behalf at the final judgment, he’d pick “that Irish brother, John O'Farrell”.

O’Farrell joined smart grid networking company Silver Spring Networks in January 2008 as executive vice president, business development. O’Farrell led the company's $90 million Series D fundraising led by Kleiner Perkins and Google; its expansion into Europe, Latin America and Asia; and its acquisition of Greenbox Technology.

He became the first non-founding partner of Andreessen Horowitz in 2010, and according to the Irish Times, he "quietly [rose] to become one of Ireland’s most senior figures in the technology world." In 2013, he moved out of investing and into an advisory role. In 2019, he became a board member at Slack, although without board voting rights, prior to its acquisition. His venture capital investments included public companies Slack and PagerDuty. He was featured on the Forbes Midas List of top technology investors in 2021. He resigned from Andreessen Horowitz in May 2025.
