= Microbriza =

Scientific classification
- Kingdom: Plantae
- Clade: Tracheophytes
- Clade: Angiosperms
- Clade: Monocots
- Clade: Commelinids
- Order: Poales
- Family: Poaceae
- Subfamily: Pooideae
- Tribe: Poeae
- Subtribe: Calothecinae
- Genus: Microbriza; Parodi ex Nicora & Rúgolo

Genus of grasses

Microbriza is a genus of grasses. It includes two species native to southern Brazil.

- Microbriza brachychaete (Ekman) Parodi ex Nicora & Rúgolo
- Microbriza poomorpha (J.Presl) Parodi ex Nicora & Rúgolo
