= Atilio Lombardo =

Uruguayan professor, botanist, and agrostologist

Atilio Lombardo Nolle (1902 - 21 June 1984) was a Uruguayan professor, botanist and agrostologist.

== Honors ==
- The Pooideae genus Lombardochloa was named in his honor.
- The Botanical Garden of Montevideo bears his name.
