= Opsware =

Software company

Opsware, Inc.
- Type: Now owned by OpenText
- Founded: September, 1999 (as Loudcloud, Inc.)
- Founder: Ben Horowitz; Marc Andreessen; Tim Howes
- Headquarters: Sunnyvale, California
- Key people: Marc Andreessen: Chairman and founder, Ben Horowitz: CEO and founder, Tim Howes: CTO and founder, In Sik Rhee: COO and founder, John O'Farrell: EVP
- Products: Cloud and automation and IT service management software
- Parent: Hewlett-Packard
- Website: Micro Focus web page

Opsware, Inc. was a software company based in Sunnyvale, California, that offered products for server and network device provisioning, configuration, and management targeted toward enterprise customers. Opsware had offices in New York City, Redmond, Washington, Cary, North Carolina, and an engineering office in Cluj, Romania.

In July 2007, HP announced that it had agreed to acquire Opsware for $1.65 billion in cash ($14.25 per share). The acquisition closed on September 21, 2007.

HP subsequently split into HP Inc. and Hewlett Packard Enterprise (HPE). The latter included Opsware's products and services and, in 2017, the HPE Software business group spin-merged with Micro Focus. Micro Focus was acquired by OpenText in 2023.

== History ==
The company that was formerly known as Loudcloud was founded on September 9, 1999 (i.e., 9/9/99) by Marc Andreessen, Ben Horowitz, Tim Howes, and In Sik Rhee as a managed services provider. The company was one of the first to offer software as a service computing with an Infrastructure as a Service model. According to Wired, Loudcloud was one of the first vendors to talk about cloud computing and Software as a Service.

In June 2000, Loudcloud raised $120 million, in what was at the time the largest second round of funding. This was shortly followed by a $100 million raise by one of its competitors, Totality Corporation (at the time known as MimEcom).

After selling the operations side of the business to EDS in the summer of 2002, Loudcloud became Opsware and went to market as a technology company, offering the software that had been developed internally to support customer systems via automated server life-cycle management. In 2004, Opsware acquired asset management systems provider Tangram Enterprise Solutions, and in February 2005 acquired network device configuration management vendor Rendition Networks. In July 2006 Opsware acquired CreekPath for its Data Center Automation (DCA) product offering to add provisioning of storage components. In April 2007 Opsware acquired Seattle-based iConclude and its run-book automation software in order to integrate datacenter management from end-to-end.

In July 2007, HP announced that it had agreed to acquire Opsware for $1.65 billion in cash ($14.25 per share), sixteen times revenues. It was HP's third largest acquisition at the time behind Compaq and Mercury Interactive. HP marketed Opsware products and software as a service solutions as part of the HP Software Business Unit.

In 2015, HP's Software business unit was spun off to become part of Hewlett-Packard Enterprise. Two years later in 2017, HP Software merged with UK-based Micro Focus in a spin-merge. In 2023, OpenText acquired Micro Focus. All former Opsware tools are now grouped under the OpenText Hybrid Cloud Management suite.

== Products ==
Opsware had three main systems that it marketed. The Server Automation System (SAS) was designed to provide provisioning, policy enforcement, compliance reporting, and patching of Windows, Unix and Linux servers across thousands of servers. It is now sold as HP Server Automation software. The Network Automation System (NAS) was designed to provide network device provisioning, policy enforcement, security lock-down, software management, and compliance reporting across thousands of devices from over 500 variants of device vendors, models, and OS versions. This product was also OEM'd by Cisco Systems and was called the Cisco "Network Compliance Manager" (NCM). It is now sold as HP Network Automation software. The third system marketed by Opsware was the Process Automation System (PAS), designed to provide run-book automation from former partner iConclude (who was acquired in March 2007). It is now sold as HP Operations Orchestration software.

== Customers ==
Opsware customers included its now parent HP, GE, EDS (whose acquisition was completed by HP August 26, 2008, and is now called HP Enterprise Services), the Federal government of the United States and numerous Fortune 500 companies who used the software to automate their IT infrastructure.
