= Rosengurttia =

Scientific classification
- Kingdom: Plantae
- Clade: Tracheophytes
- Clade: Angiosperms
- Clade: Monocots
- Clade: Commelinids
- Order: Poales
- Family: Poaceae
- Subfamily: Pooideae
- Tribe: Poeae
- Subtribe: Calothecinae
- Genus: Rosengurttia; L.N.Silva
- Species: R. monandra

Binomial name
- Rosengurttia monandra (Hack.) L.N.Silva

Synonyms
- Briza lilloi Parodi; Briza mandoniana (Griseb.) Henrard; Briza monandra (Hack.) Pilg.; Chascolytrum monandrum (Hack.) Essi, Longhi-Wagner & Souza-Chies; Poa monandra Hack. (basionym); Poidium monandrum (Hack.) Matthei; Calotheca stricta var. mandoniana Griseb.

Genus of grasses

Rosengurttia is a genus of grasses. It includes a single species, Rosengurttia monandra, a perennial native to Colombia, Ecuador, Peru, Bolivia, northwestern Argentina, and southern Brazil. It is used for medicine.
