= Ben Horowitz =

American technology entrepreneur (born 1966)

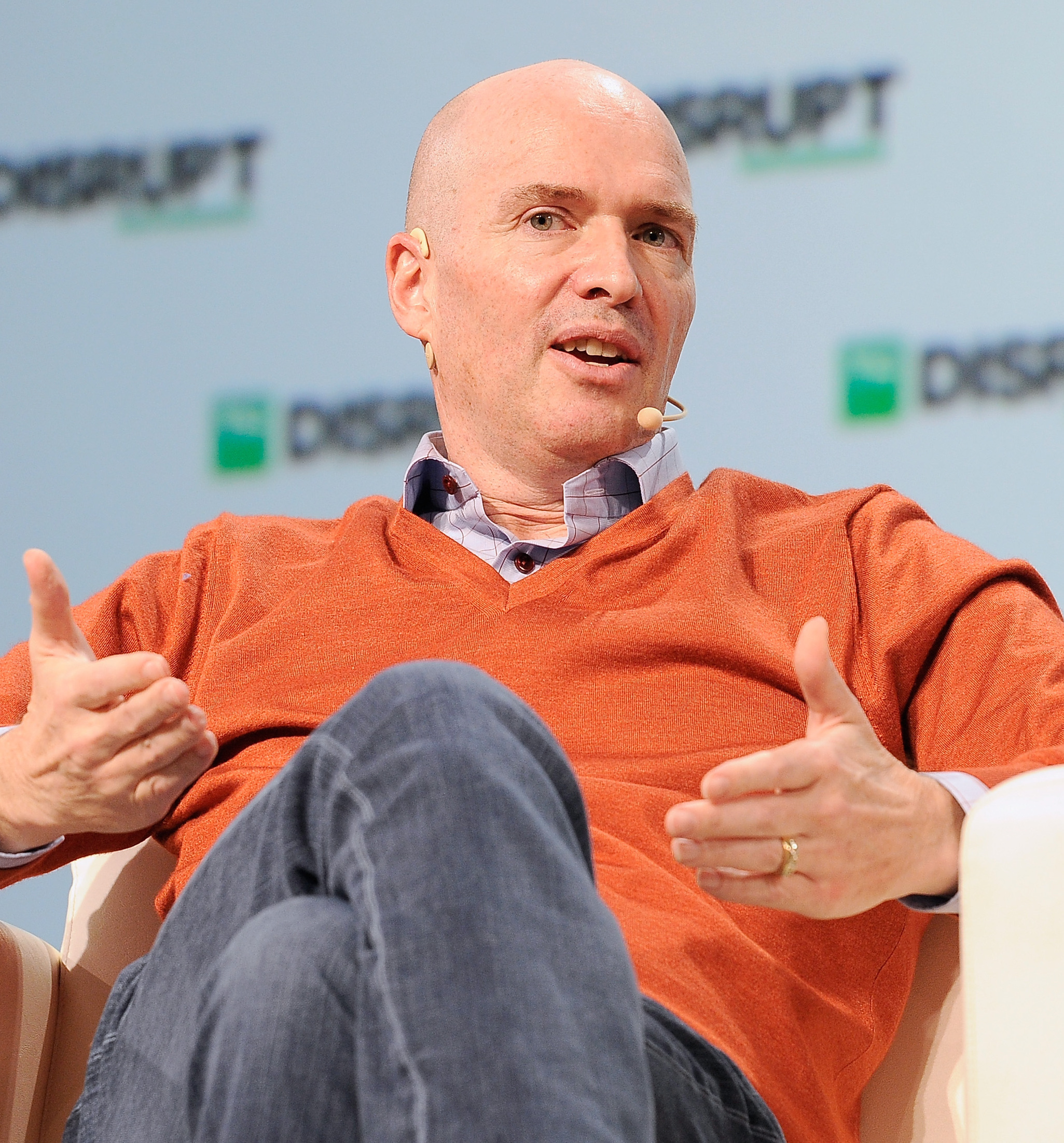
- Horowitz in 2018
- Born: Benjamin Abraham Horowitz; January 13, 1966 (age 60); London, England
- Education: Columbia University (BA); University of California, Los Angeles (MS)
- Occupations: Co-founder of Opsware and Andreessen Horowitz
- Spouse: Felicia Wiley (m. 1988)
- Children: 3
- Father: David Horowitz

Benjamin Abraham Horowitz (born January 13, 1966) is an American businessman, investor, blogger, and author. He is a technology entrepreneur and co-founder of the venture capital firm Andreessen Horowitz along with Marc Andreessen. He previously co-founded and served as president and chief executive officer of the enterprise software company Opsware, which Hewlett-Packard acquired in 2007. Horowitz is the author of The Hard Thing About Hard Things: Building a Business When There Are No Easy Answers, a book about startups, and What You Do Is Who You Are: How to Create Your Business Culture.

== Early life and education ==
Benjamin Abraham Horowitz was born in London, England and raised in Berkeley, California, the son of Elissa Krauthamer and conservative writer and policy advocate David Horowitz. He is of Russian Jewish ancestry.

Horowitz earned a B.A. from Columbia University in 1988 and an M.S. from University of California, Los Angeles in 1990, both in computer science.

== Career ==
Horowitz began his career as an engineer at Silicon Graphics in 1990. In 1995, he joined Marc Andreessen at Netscape as a product manager. From 1997 to 1998, Horowitz was vice president for the Directory and Security Product Line at Netscape. After Netscape was acquired by AOL in 1998, Horowitz served as Vice President of AOL's eCommerce Division.

In September 1999, Horowitz cofounded Loudcloud with Andreessen, Tim Howes, and In Sik Rhee. Loudcloud offered infrastructure and application hosting services to enterprise and Internet customers such as Ford Motor Company, Nike, Inc., Gannett Company, News Corporation, the United States Army and other large organizations. Horowitz took Loudcloud public on March 9, 2001.

In June 2002, Horowitz began a transformation of Loudcloud into Opsware, an enterprise software company. He took the first step by selling Loudcloud's core managed services business to Electronic Data Systems for $63.5 million in cash. This transaction transferred all of Loudcloud's revenue to EDS while the company was publicly traded on Nasdaq. Beginning with EDS as its first enterprise software customer, Horowitz grew Opsware to hundreds of enterprise customers, over $100 million in annual revenue, and 550 employees. In July 2007, Horowitz sold Opsware to Hewlett-Packard for $1.6 billion in cash.

Horowitz was Loudcloud's and Opsware's president and chief executive officer for the entire history of the company. Along the way, shares of Opsware initial public offering price at $6 sank to $0.35 per share, eventually becoming $14.25 a share at the time of its sale to HP.

Following the sale of Opsware to Hewlett-Packard, Horowitz then spent one year at Hewlett-Packard as vice president and general manager in HP Software with responsibility for 3,000 employees and $2.8 billion in annual revenue.

=== Andreessen Horowitz ===
On July 6, 2009, Horowitz and Andreessen launched Andreessen Horowitz, to invest in and advise both early-stage startups and more established growth companies in high technology. Andreessen Horowitz began with an initial capitalization of $300 million and within three years had $2.7 billion under management across three funds.

== Bibliography ==
- Horowitz, Ben (2014). The Hard Thing About Hard Things: Building a Business When There Are No Easy Answers, Harper Business. ISBN 0062273205
- Horowitz, Ben (2019). What You Do Is Who You Are: How to Create Your Business Culture, Harper Business. ISBN 0062871331

== Personal life ==
Horowitz lives in Las Vegas with his wife, Felicia Wiley Horowitz. They married in 1988 and have three children.

In July 2024, Horowitz announced he will donate to super PACs that support Donald Trump's presidential campaign. In October, however, Horowitz announced that he and his wife will be making "significant" donations to groups that support Kamala Harris's campaign, citing their friendship dating back over 10 years. During the first half of 2025, Horowitz donated $3 million to MAGA Inc., a super PAC that supports Donald Trump.
