= Felicis =

Venture capital firm

- Type: Private
- Industry: Venture capital
- Founded: 2006
- Founder: Aydin Senkut
- Headquarters: Menlo Park, California
- Website: felicis.com

Felicis is a venture capital firm that invests in start-up technology companies. It was founded in 2006 by Aydin Senkut. The company has offices in Menlo Park, California, San Francisco, California and New York City.

Felicis has invested early in Shopify, Plaid Inc., Canva, CreditKarma, Notion, and Mercor. In 2016, Inc. magazine named Felicis one of the “Top 13 Seed Investors in Silicon Valley”, and in 2026, Forbes included the firm’s founder and managing partner Aydin Senkut on its Midas List of the World’s Best Venture Capital Investors, for the 13th consecutive year.

== Background and philosophy ==
Felicis was established in 2006 by Aydin Senkut, a Turkish-born executive who was the first product manager at Google. The New York Times listed Senkut as one of the Top 20 Venture Capitalists in the world in 2017.

The company has its headquarters in Silicon Valley’s Menlo Park in San Mateo County, California. Felicis focuses on early-stage technology investments across sectors including AI, cybersecurity, global resilience, health and biotech. Forbes describes Felicis as a "nimble boutique VC, able to move faster than larger funds". The company has invested in companies in the United States, Canada, Brazil, Germany, Estonia, Finland and the Near East.

In 2014, Felicis gained attention by including a clause in its term sheets that pledged not to vote against a founder, effectively aligning its interests with those of the entrepreneur. By 2014, Felicis, had invested in 50 startups that were either acquired or sold shares in an initial public offering.

In 2018 launched the Founder Pledge, which commits 1% of every first check to founder performance and development, including leadership, coaching and CEO peer groups. Former Consumer Vice President of OpenAI’s ChatGPT team Peter Deng joined Felicis in 2025.

== History ==
=== 2010s ===
In 2010, the firm began its transition from a solo venture to an institutional fund, hiring two investors. It participated in the $15 million Series A funding round of Shopify, an e‑commerce platform, along with Bessemer Venture Partners, FirstMark Capital and Georgian Partners. It followed up with participating in funding the company’s Series B (2011) and Series C round (2013), along with the others, OMERS Ventures and Insight Venture Partners. Shopify went public on the New York Stock Exchange in 2015.

In 2013, Felicis was a seed round investor in Plaid, the San Francisco-based fintech company that connects consumer bank accounts to financial apps. In the fall of 2013, Felicis first invested in Adyen, a global payments platform headquartered in the Netherlands, and followed up with participating in its $250 million Series B round in December 2014. In 2013, Felicis also invested in Notion, a productivity and collaboration tool used by businesses and individuals worldwide.

In 2015, Felicis led the Series A funding round of Australian online design platform Canva. As of August 2025, Canva was valued at $42 billion.

=== 2020s ===
Felicis took part in the Seed, Series A and Series B funding rounds for Credit Karma, an Oakland, California based company offering free credit scores and financial tools. In 2020, Credit Karma was acquired by Intuit for $7.1 billion.

In 2021, Felicis led the Series A funding into Berlin-based workflow automation platform n8n. In 2022, Felicis led the $80 million Series B funding into Supabase, an open-source backend-as-a-service (BaaS) alternative to Google’s Firebase and were the biggest investor in the $50 million Series C funding into Runway ML, one of the startups behind the deep learning, text-to-image AI model, Stable Diffusion.

In 2024, Felicis led a $21.5 million Series A funding round for Wherobots, a cloud-based geospatial platform.

In 2025, Felicis led the Series B funding round for Mercor, an AI-driven recruiting startup based in San Francisco that automates talent sourcing and hiring for technology companies, and led the Series C funding in Mercor later that year. In June 2025, the firm raised their tenth fund, their highest to date at $900 million, bringing its assets under management to over $3.8 billion. Felicis has invested in security technology company Verkada since 2019, and in 2025 was part of the $200 million Series E funding.

In 2026, Forbes included Felicis founder Aydin Senkut on its Midas List of the World’s Best Venture Capital Investors, for the 13th consecutive year. In 2026, Business Insider included Senkut on the AI Power List.
