= Richard Peery =

American real estate developer

- Born: 1938 or 1939 (age 86–87)
- Education: Brigham Young University
- Occupation: Real estate developer
- Spouse: Mimi Peery
- Children: 4

Richard Peery (born 1938 or 1939) is an American billionaire real estate developer.

== Early life ==
Richard Peery is the son of Taylor Peery, who graduated from Stanford University in 1927 and Stanford Business School in 1929 before a career in banking and real estate. Richard has a bachelor's degree from Brigham Young University and dropped out of the MBA program at Stanford.

== Career ==
In his 20s, he took over the management of his father's property portfolio. In the 1960s, he teamed up with fellow real estate developer John Arrillaga, who died in 2022. Together, they bought Silicon Valley farmland to create office parks and became billionaires. Peery owns about 3.3 million square feet of office space, with tenants including Google and Intuit.

He is active in philanthropy through the Peery Foundation.

As of 2024, he had a net worth of US$3.6 billion, ranking him No. 374 on the Forbes 400 list of the richest people in America. Source: https://www.forbes.com/profile/richard-peery/

== Personal life ==
He is married to Mimi Peery and is the brother of Nancy Peery Marriott. Richard and Mimi have four children: Dennis, Jason, Jennifer, and David. He lives in Palo Alto, California. He is a member of The Church of Jesus Christ of Latter-day Saints.
