= Bernardo Rosengurtt =

Uruguayan botanist, professor, and agrostologist

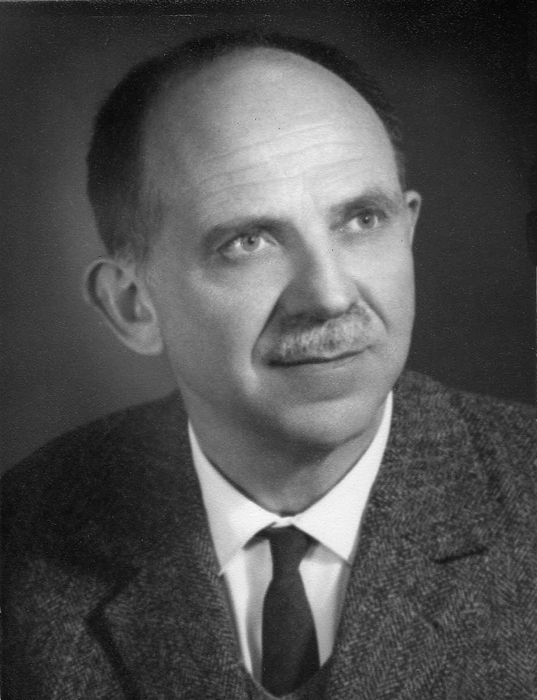
Bernardo Rosengurtt in 1975.

Bernardo Rosengurtt Gurvich (1916–1985) was a Uruguayan botanist, professor and agrostologist.
