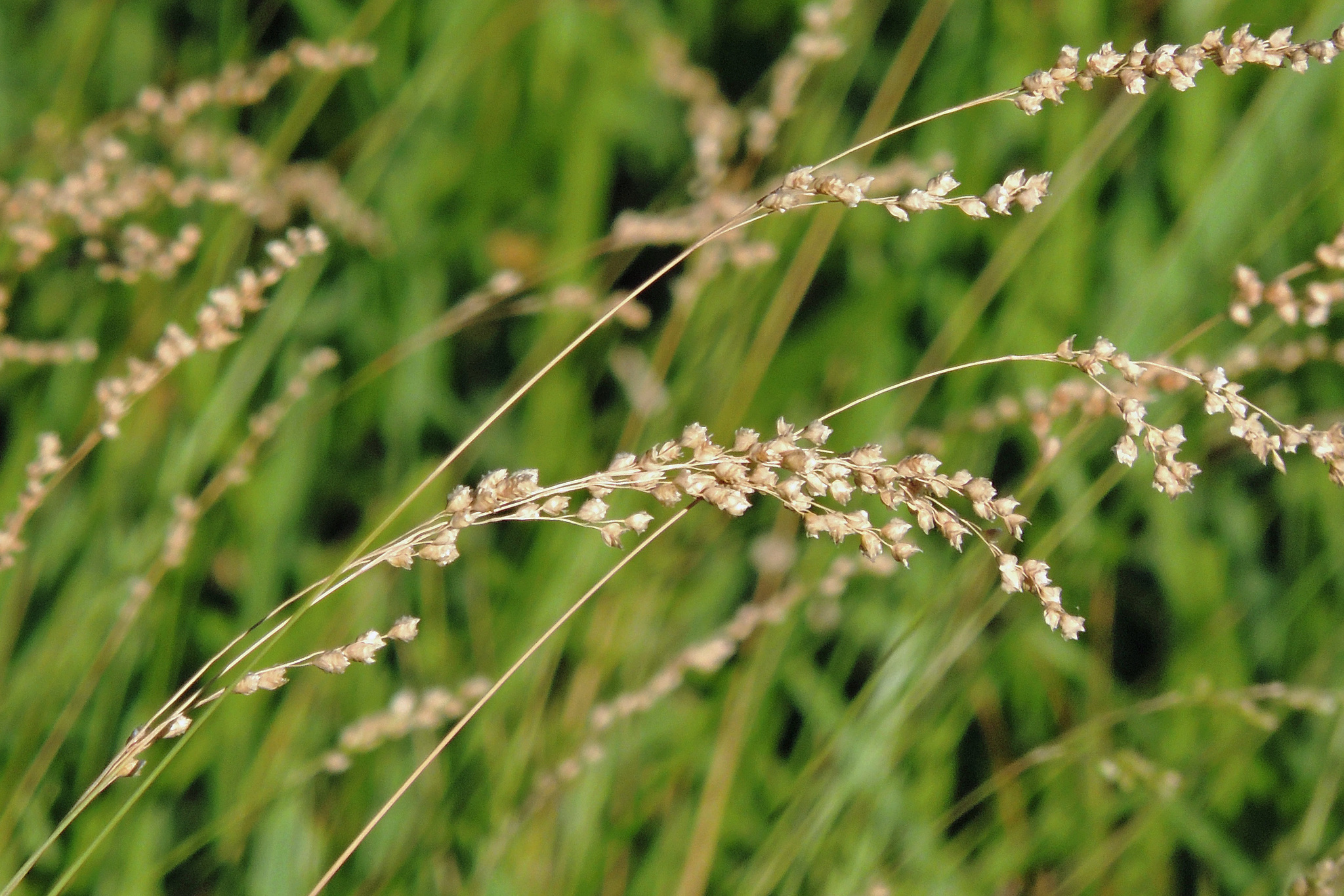
- Chascolytrum subaristatum

Scientific classification
- Kingdom: Plantae
- Clade: Tracheophytes
- Clade: Angiosperms
- Clade: Monocots
- Clade: Commelinids
- Order: Poales
- Family: Poaceae
- Subfamily: Pooideae
- Tribe: Poeae
- Subtribe: Calothecinae; Soreng

Type genus
- Calotheca Desv.

Genera
- see text

= Calothecinae =

Subtribe of grasses

Calothecineae is a subtribe of grasses in the tribe Poeae. It includes nine genera.

- Boldrinia L.N.Silva
- Calotheca Desv.
- Chascolytrum Desv.
- Condilorachia P.M.Peterson, Romasch. & Soreng
- Erianthecium Parodi
- Lombardochloa Roseng. & B.R.Arrill.
- Microbriza Parodi ex Nicora & Rúgolo
- Poidium Nees
- Rhombolytrum Link
- Rosengurttia L.N.Silva
