= Boldrinia =

Scientific classification
- Kingdom: Plantae
- Clade: Tracheophytes
- Clade: Angiosperms
- Clade: Monocots
- Clade: Commelinids
- Order: Poales
- Family: Poaceae
- Subfamily: Pooideae
- Tribe: Poeae
- Subtribe: Calothecinae
- Genus: Boldrinia; Boldrinia
- Species: B. parodiana

Binomial name
- Boldrinia parodiana (Roseng., B.R.Arrill. & Izag.) L.N.Silva

Synonyms
- Briza parodiana Roseng., B.R.Arrill. & Izag.; Chascolytrum parodianum (Roseng., B.R.Arrill. & Izag.) Matthei

Genus of grasses

Boldrinia is a genus of grasses. It includes a single species, Boldrinia parodiana, a perennial native to southern Brazil and Uruguay.
