= Aydin Senkut =

Turkish-American venture capitalist (Born 1969)

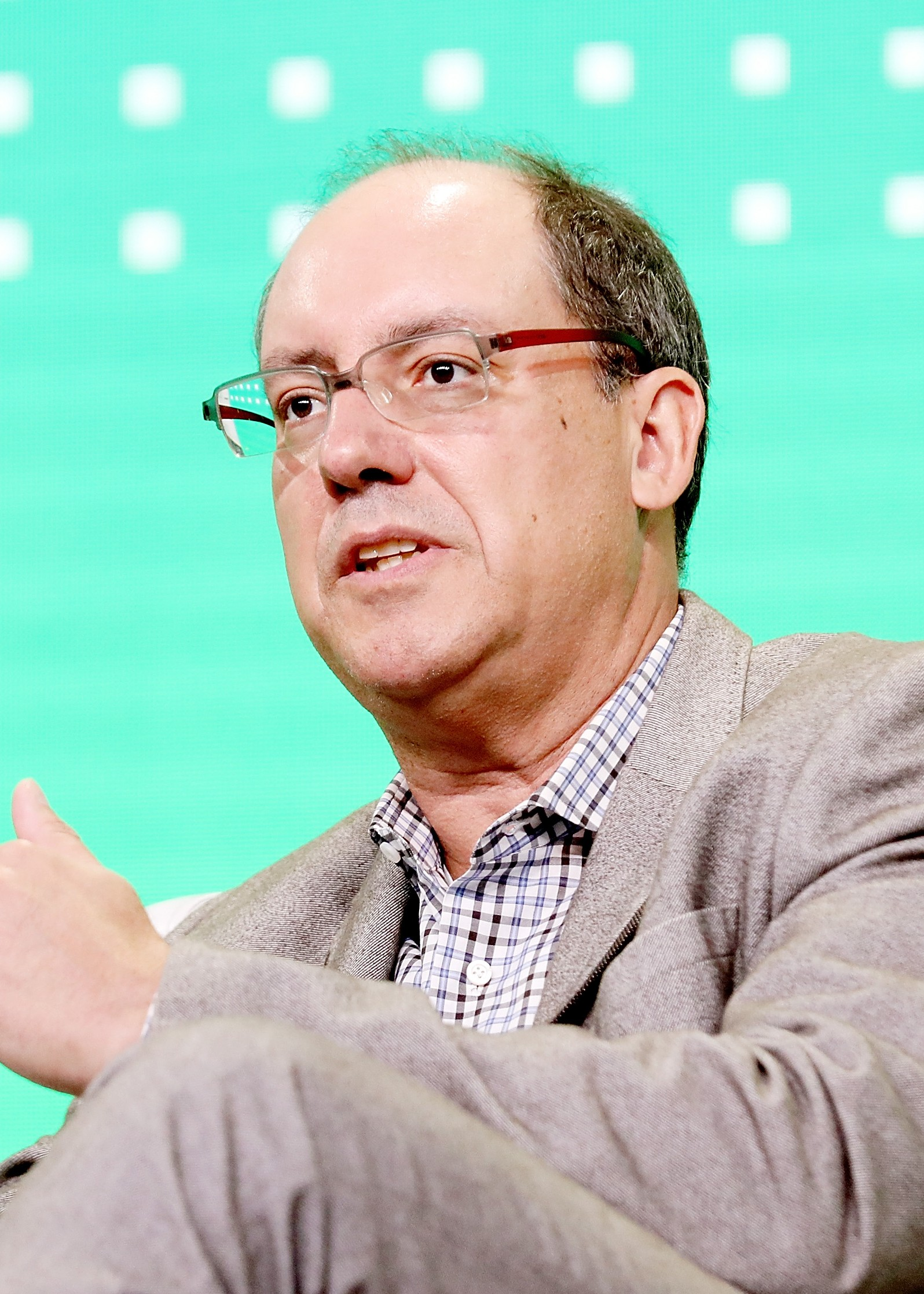
- Senkut in 2022
- Born: 1969 (age 56–57); Istanbul, Turkey.
- Education: Boston University, Wharton School of the University of Pennsylvania
- Occupation: Venture capitalist
- Known for: Early employees at Google
- Spouse: Sonia Arrison

Aydin Senkut is a Turkish-American venture capitalist and the founder of Felicis, a venture capital firm based in Menlo Park, California. He was among the early employees at Google, where he was the company’s first product manager. As an investor, he's recognized for early-stage investments in startups across enterprise software, artificial intelligence, and software infrastructure.

== Early life and education ==
Senkut was born in Istanbul, Turkey. He is fluent in Turkish, English, French, German, and Portuguese.

He earned his undergraduate degree from Boston University in 1992 and an MBA from the Wharton School of the University of Pennsylvania in 1996. He is on Wharton’s Graduate Executive Board.

He is married to author Sonia Arrison.

== Career ==
Senkut began his career in the finance department of pharmaceutical company Hoffmann-La Roche, followed by a business development role at Silicon Graphics (SGI).

He joined Google in 1999 as employee #63. He was the company’s first product manager, its first international sales manager, and later as a senior manager for web search and syndication. In 2005, a year after Google went public, he left the company to focus on investing.

=== Angel investing and Felicis Ventures ===
Senkut began angel investing in 2005, making early bets on approximately three dozen startups. He also organized gatherings of Google alumni to exchange investment ideas.

He founded Felicis in 2006 and raised the firm’s first institutional fund in 2010.

Notable early investments by Senkut include Shopify, Adyen, Notion, Fitbit, Credit Karma, and Rovio, the developer of Angry Birds.

Felicis is known for its founder-aligned governance approach, including a policy to vote its shares in line with company founders.

== Recognition ==
Senkut has been named to the Forbes Midas List for thirteen consecutive years, from 2014 to 2026. He has also been recognized by The New York Times as a "Top Tech Investor" and was named one of the Top 25 Angel Investors by BusinessWeek in 2010. In 2026, Business Insider included Senkut on the AI Power List.
