= Andrew M. Peery =

American politician

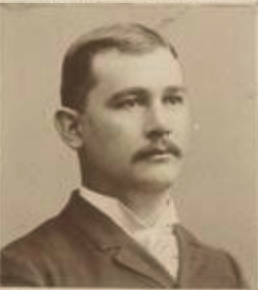

Member of the Virginia House of Delegates from Tazewell County
- In office December 2, 1891 – December 6, 1893
- Preceded by: John W. Crockett
- Succeeded by: J. Howe Sayers

Personal details
- Born: Andrew McDonald Peery; December 4, 1865 Tazewell, Virginia, U.S.
- Died: June 5, 1906 (aged 40) Tazewell, Virginia, U.S.
- Party: Democratic
- Spouse: Sallie Mae Gildersleeve

Andrew McDonald Peery (December 4, 1865 – June 5, 1906) was an American politician who served in the Virginia House of Delegates.
