= Maria Arrillaga =

Puerto Rican writer

María Arrillaga
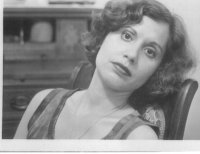
- Born: 1940 (age 85–86); Mayagüez, Puerto Rico
- Citizenship: US
- Occupations: Poet, writer, academic
- Writing career
- Language: Spanish, English
- Genres: Poetry, fiction

María Arrillaga (born 1940) is a Puerto Rican poet who has been a professor at the University of Puerto Rico. She taught in the Spanish Department on the Rio Piedras campus. She is the author of several collections of poetry.

== Academic education and employment ==
Arrillaga received her BS in English in 1961 from St. Louis University, her MA in Spanish from the School of Education at New York University, New York, in 1966, and a PhD from University of Puerto Rico in 1987, on the subject of Latin American and Puerto Rican literature and Women's Studies.

From 1970 to 1971 she was an instructor of art and music of Puerto Rico, New York City Technical College, Brooklyn, New York. From 1973 to 2001 she was a Spanish Professor, College of General Studies, University of Puerto Rico, Río Piedras Campus. In 1993–94 she was a visiting professor, York College, Queens (CUNY), teaching Women's Literature and Creative Writing. Between 2002 and 2005 she was an adjunct professor of Spanish at New York City Technical College, Brooklyn, New York.

== Publications ==
=== Poetry ===
==== Poetry collections ====
- Flamingos en San Juan/Flamingos in Manhattan, San Juan, Puerto Rico, Ediciones Puerto, 2012, 207 pp.
- Cuidades como mares: Poesia 1966–1993, San Juan, Puerto Rico, Isla negra, 2012, 292 pp.
- Yo soy Filí Melé ("I am Fili Mele"), compilation of previous work and two additional unpublished collections. Río Piedras, Puerto Rico, University of PR Press, 1999, 276 pp.
- Frescura 1981 ("Freshness 1981"), Río Piedras, Puerto Rico, Mairena, 1981, 112 pp.
- Poemas 747, Poems 747, Madrid, Seteco, 1977, 50 pp.
- Cascada de sol ("Cascade of sun"), San Juan, Puerto Rico, Institute of Puerto Rican Culture, 1977, 92 pp.
- New York in the Sixties, Youlgrave, Bakewell, Derbyshire, England, Hub Publications Ltd, 1976, 20 pp.
- Vida en el tiempo ("Life in time"), San Juan, Institute of Puerto Rican Culture, 1974, 134 pp.

=== Novel ===
- Mañana Valentina ("Tomorrow Valentina") Institute of Puerto Rican Culture and Room of One's Own Publisher, Chile, 1995.

== See also ==
- List of Puerto Rican writers
- Puerto Rican literature
- Multi-Ethnic Literature of the United States
