= Laura Arrillaga-Andreessen =

American philanthropist, educator and author

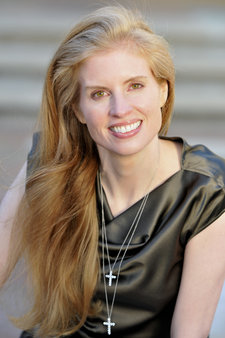
- Arrillaga-Andreessen in 2011
- Born: Laura Arrillaga; 1969 or 1970 (age 56–57); Palo Alto, California, U.S.
- Education: Stanford University (BA, MEd, MA, MBA)
- Occupations: Philanthropist, author
- Spouse: Marc Andreessen (m. 2006)
- Children: 1
- Father: John Arrillaga

Laura K Arrillaga-Andreessen (born 26 Aug 1970) is an American author and philanthropist. She is married to tech billionaire Marc Andreessen.

Born to wealthy parents, she became the founder and president of the Laura Arrillaga-Andreessen Foundation, a private philanthropic foundation that describes itself as a philanthropic "innovation lab", and founded the Silicon Valley Social Venture Fund (SV2), a venture philanthropy fund.

== Early life and education ==
Arrillaga-Andreessen was born in Palo Alto, California, the daughter of Frances C. Arrillaga and billionaire real estate developer John Arrillaga, Sr. She received a BA (1992) and MA (1999) in art history from Stanford University, an MA (1998) in education from the Stanford School of Education, and an MBA (1997) from the Stanford Graduate School of Business.

== Career ==
While attending the Stanford Graduate School of Business, Arrillaga-Andreessen developed a business plan for an organization to teach philanthropy and make grants based on venture capital firm investment strategies. The organization became the Silicon Valley Social Venture Fund (SV2), which Arrillaga-Andreessen founded in 1998 and served as its chairman until 2008; as of 2011 she was its chairman emeritus.

In 2006, she founded and served as board chairman of Stanford PACS (Center on Philanthropy and Civil Society), a social change research center. She has been an Instructor at the Stanford Graduate School of Business since 2000 and teaches courses on philanthropy and on leadership.

In 2011, Arrillaga-Andreessen's book Giving 2.0: Transform Your Giving and Our World was published by Jossey-Bass, and she writes about philanthropy for The Huffington Post.

In 2015, Arrillaga-Andreesen penned a story for T, the style magazine of the New York Times, which discussed various companies including AirBNB and Theranos. Arrillaga-Andreesen failed to disclose in the article that her husband, Marc Andreesen, was a major investor in both of those companies, resulting in the Times decision to make an admission that the article was a clear conflict of interest.

== Personal life ==
Arrillaga-Andreessen has said her mother's volunteer work was a strong influence on her when she was growing up in Palo Alto. She became active in philanthropy after her mother's early death from cancer. Arrillaga-Andreessen married Marc Andreessen in 2006. Together they have one son, carried by a gestational surrogate. He was named John after her father and according to Business Insider. Arrillaga-Andreessen and her husband co-founded the Marc and Laura Andreessen Foundation. Arrillaga-Andreessen is the Foundation's president. In 2025, Laura and Marc donated $2 million to Stanford Health Care to help defer costs from the COVID 19 pandemic.

In 2022, Arrillaga-Andreessen and her husband advocated against the construction of 131 multifamily housing units in their town, Atherton, California.

== Honors ==
In 2001, Arrillaga-Andreessen received the Jacqueline Kennedy Award for Women in Leadership and in April 2005 became a Henry Crown Fellow of the Aspen Institute. She was awarded the President's Volunteer Service Award from the Points of Light Foundation in June 2005 and Silicon Valley Children and Family Services' Outstanding Philanthropist Award in 2009. In 2011, she and Marc Andreessen received Global Citizen Awards from the Global Philanthropy Forum of the World Affairs Councils of America.
