= John Arrillaga =

American businessman (1937–2022)

- Born: April 3, 1937; Inglewood, California, U.S.
- Died: January 24, 2022 (aged 84); Portola Valley, California, U.S.
- Education: Stanford University
- Occupations: Real estate developer, philanthropist
- Spouses: Frances Marion Cook (m. 1968; died 1995); Gioia Fasi
- Children: 2, including Laura Arrillaga-Andreessen
- Relatives: Marc Andreessen (son-in-law)
- Website: www.peery-arrillaga.com

John Arrillaga (April 3, 1937 – January 24, 2022) was an American billionaire real estate developer and philanthropist who was one of the largest landowners in Silicon Valley. He was also a college basketball player when he attended Stanford University.

== Early life and education ==
Arrillaga was born on April 3, 1937, in Inglewood, California, one of five children in a lower-middle-class home with his mother, Freida, and father, Gabriel, who traced his roots to the Basque region. His mother was a former nurse who worked in a laundry to support the family, while his father worked at a produce market. He attended Morningside High School in Inglewood, and graduated in 1955.

Arrillaga attended Stanford University on a basketball scholarship. At Stanford, he was a member of Delta Tau Delta. He played on the university's basketball team and earned first-team all-conference and third-team All American honors for the 1959–60 season. After he graduated from Stanford with a bachelor's degree in geography, Arrillaga played basketball for Bilbao Águilas in Spain's Liga Nacional, and was the league's second highest point-scorer. He played briefly in the NBA for the San Francisco Warriors.

== Career ==
Arrillaga started his career selling insurance before buying his first property—a run-down commercial building, which he fixed and let for rent to buy a second building.

Arrillaga established his career as a real estate developer starting in the 1960s, partnering with Richard Peery in acquiring California farmland which they converted into office space. Their partnership took off with the growth of the semiconductor industry and other high-tech businesses, such as Intel, in what became known as Silicon Valley. Arrillaga and Peery converted thousands of acres of farmland into office space in cities such as Mountain View, San Jose, and Sunnyvale to meet the industry's needs. Over a period of 50 years, their partnership, Peery Arrillaga, built over 20 million square feet of commercial real estate, becoming one of Silicon Valley's biggest commercial landlords. In 2006, he sold over five million square feet of his real estate holdings for roughly $1.1 billion to the real estate division of Deutsche Bank. In 2020 Arrillaga ranked No. 339 on the Forbes 400 list of the richest people in America. In October 2020, his net worth was $2.5 billion.

== Philanthropy ==
Arrillaga was known for his support of his alma mater, Stanford University. The Frances C. Arrillaga Alumni Center is named in memory of his first wife. The Stanford Department of Athletics is housed in the Arrillaga Family Sports Center. Many other athletic facilities carry his surname, in addition to some that helped to renovate or rebuild. Altogether he built, or made the major donation to, 200 Stanford projects. He also endowed 57 full scholarships, 38 of them athletic scholarships; notable recipients included Tiger Woods, Katie Ledecky, and Christian McCaffrey. He personally supervised the major renovation of Stanford Stadium in 2005–2006 with an insistence that it be completed in nine months, so as not to cause any disruption to the football season.

In May 2006, Arrillaga gave $100 million to Stanford University and followed it with a $151 million donation in 2013, the largest individual donation from a living donor in the university's history. The university awarded him the 'Degree of Uncommon Man' in 2009 for his contributions to the university.

== Personal life and death ==
In 1968, Arrillaga married Frances Marion Cook, a teacher and librarian. She died on October 13, 1995, in their Palo Alto home of lung cancer at age 54. They had two children together, John Jr. and Laura. Their daughter Laura Arrillaga-Andreessen is married to Marc Andreessen, who helped create the Mosaic web browser and co-founded Netscape; he is co-founder of several other web technology enterprises. Their son John Arrillaga Jr. is married to Justine Stamen Arrillaga, founder of the TEAK Fellowship. After the death of his first wife, Arrillaga married Gioia Fasi, a former lawyer from Honolulu, Hawaii.

Arrillaga died in Portola Valley on January 24, 2022, at the age of 84.
