= Ted Wang =

American venture capitalist and lawyer

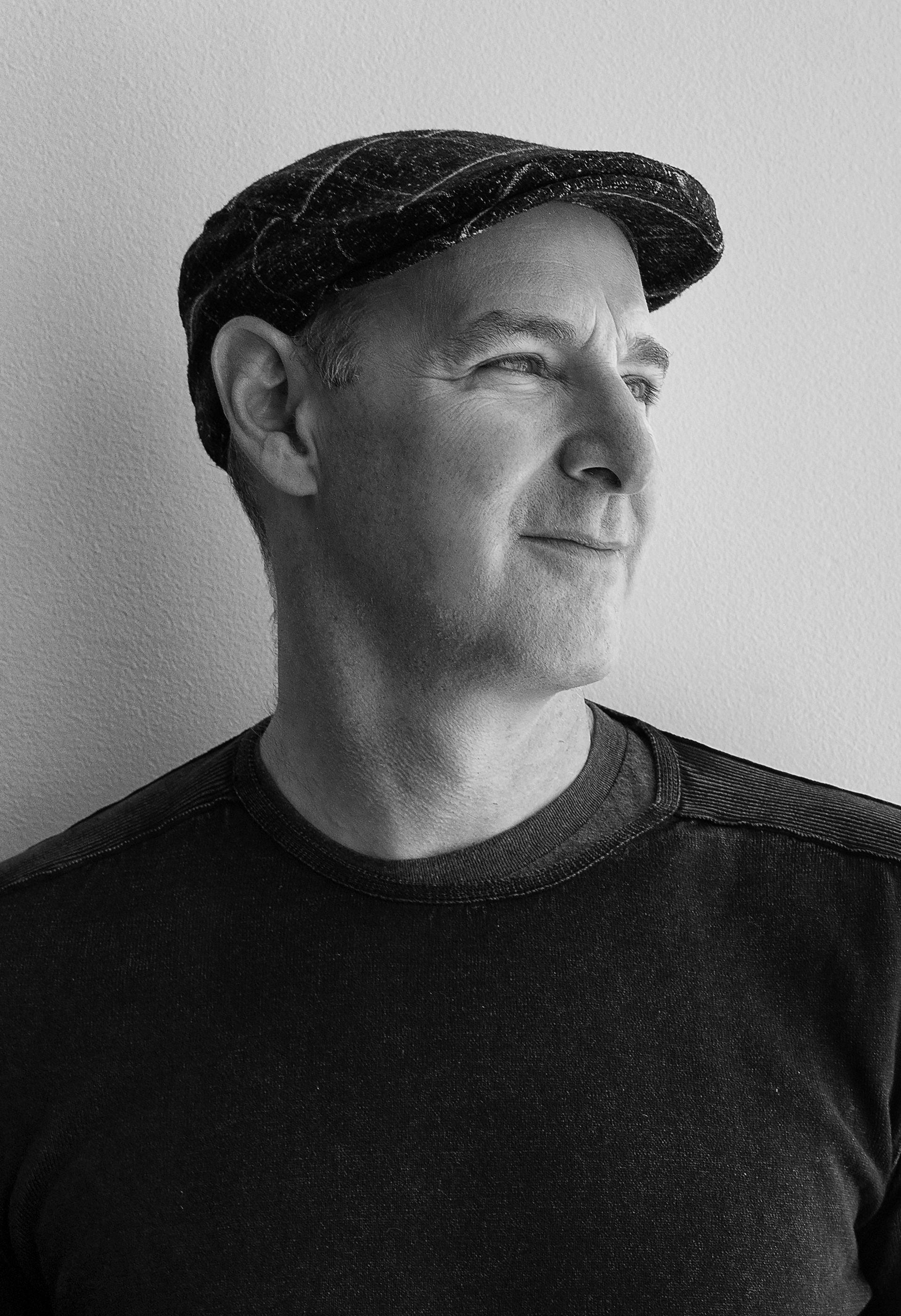
- Wang in 2019
- Education: Duke University; University of Virginia
- Known for: Series Seed Documents

Ted Wang is an American venture capitalist and lawyer. He is a partner at Cowboy Ventures and is known for the creation of the Series Seed Documents.

== Life ==
Wang earned a bachelor's degree from Duke University, where he was active in student government. Later he went on to obtain a Juris Doctor degree from the University of Virginia School of Law.

Before transitioning to venture capital, Wang established himself as one of the country's leading startup lawyers and spent over a decade as a partner with the technology law firm Fenwick & West. He served as outside counsel to various successful venture-backed technology companies, including Facebook, Twitter, Dropbox, and Wealthfront. Wang has been recognized for his contributions to the legal field, including the creation of the open-source Series Seed Documents in 2010.

Following his departure from Fenwick & West, Wang became a board partner at Cowboy Ventures, a seed-stage venture fund based in the Bay Area. He also assisted companies in understanding the metrics needed to secure Series A and Series B financing.
