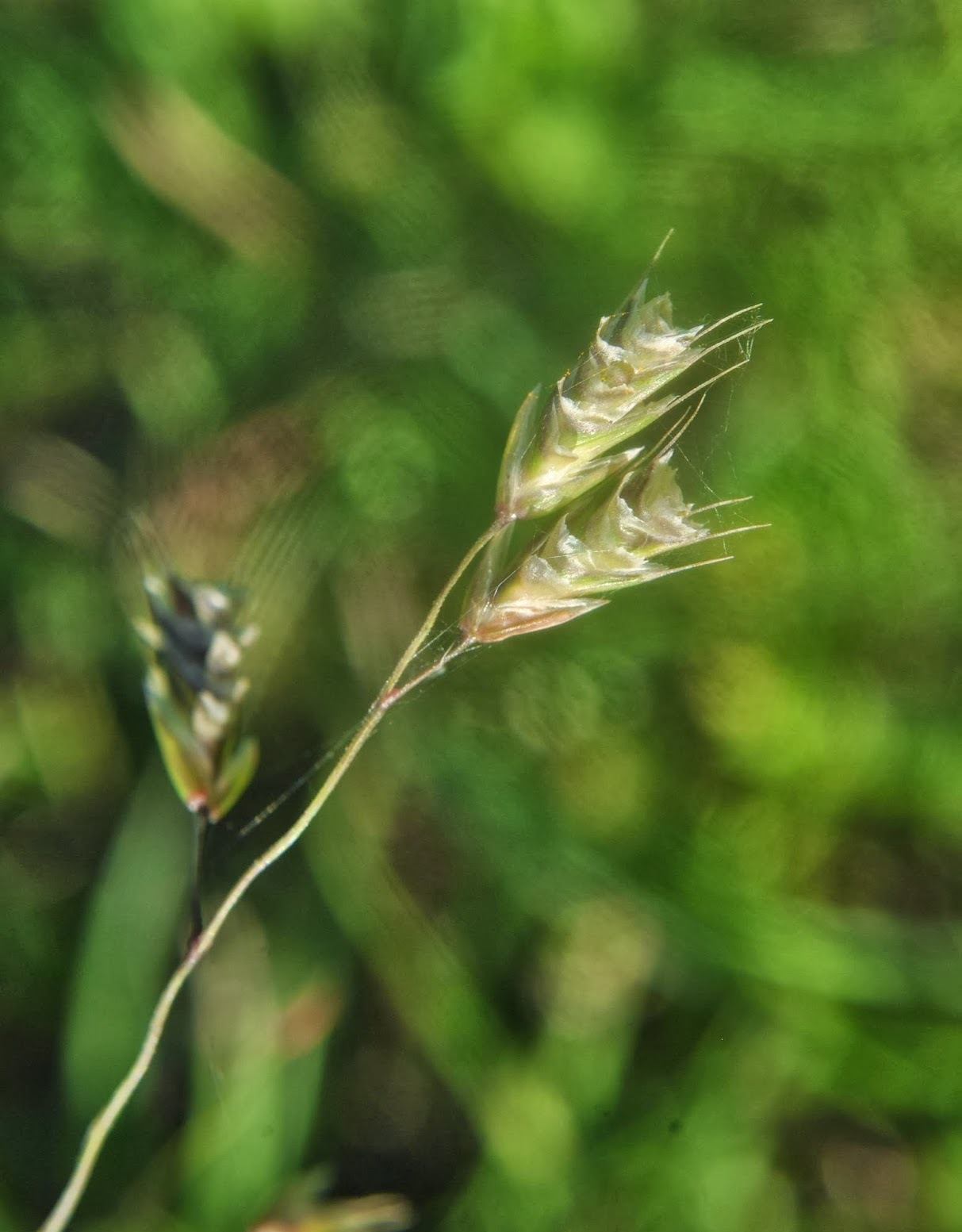

Scientific classification
- Kingdom: Plantae
- Clade: Embryophytes
- Clade: Tracheophytes
- Clade: Spermatophytes
- Clade: Angiosperms
- Clade: Monocots
- Clade: Commelinids
- Order: Poales
- Family: Poaceae
- Subfamily: Pooideae
- Tribe: Poeae
- Subtribe: Calothecinae
- Genus: Calotheca; Desv.
- Species: C. brizoides

Binomial name
- Calotheca brizoides (Lam.) P.Beauv. (1812)

Synonyms
- Briza brizoides (Lam.) Kuntze (1898); Briza elegans (P. Beauv.) Döll (1878), nom. illeg.; Briza patula Phil. (1896); Briza tandilensis Parodi, 1920; Bromus brizoides Lam. (1791); Calotheca brizoidea Desv. (1810); Calotheca elegans P. Beauv. (1812); Chascolytrum brizoides (Lam.) Essi, Longhi-Wagner & Souza-Chies (2011); Chascolytrum elegans P.Beauv. (1812), pro syn.

= Calotheca brizoides =

Species of grass

Calotheca brizoides is a species of grass in the family Poaceae. It is the sole species in genus Calotheca. It is native to Buenos Aires Province of Argentina, Uruguay, Rio Grande do Sul state in Brazil, and Biobio Region of Chile.
