= Blanca Renée Arrillaga =

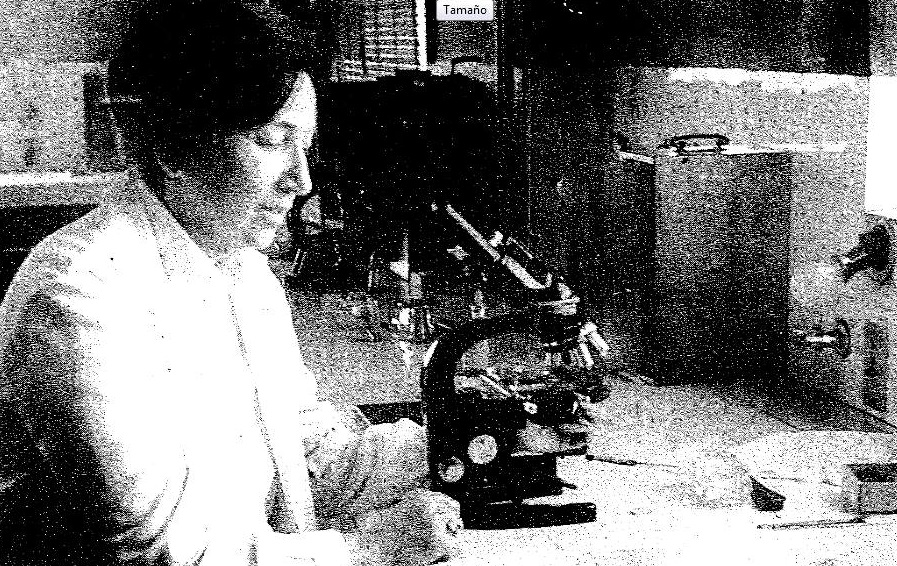
Blanca Renée Arrillaga

Blanca Renée Arrillaga Oronoz de Maffei (Artigas, 1917–2011) was a Uruguayan chemist, botanist, professor and agrostologist. Originally from the Uruguayan Department of Artigas, she began her studies there then moved to Montevideo where she earned a degree in pharmaceutical chemistry from the Faculty of Chemistry at the University of the Republic (Uruguay). Her most important publications include 'Nuevas especies y notas taxonómicas en Uruguay y Paraguay' (1968) in collaboration; Plantas Medicinales (1969) and Gramíneas Uruguayas (1970) with B. Rosengurtt and P. Izaguirre de Artucio.
