= Lombardochloa =

Scientific classification
- Kingdom: Plantae
- Clade: Tracheophytes
- Clade: Angiosperms
- Clade: Monocots
- Clade: Commelinids
- Order: Poales
- Family: Poaceae
- Subfamily: Pooideae
- Tribe: Poeae
- Subtribe: Calothecinae
- Genus: Lombardochloa; Roseng. & B.R.Arrill.
- Species: L. rufa

Binomial name
- Lombardochloa rufa (J.Presl) Roseng. & B.R.Arrill.

Synonyms
- Briza rufa (J.Presl) Steud.; Briza rufa var. sparsipilosa Roseng., B.R.Arrill. & Izag.; Chascolytrum rufum J.Presl in C.B.Presl; Chascolytrum rufum var. sparsipilosum (Roseng., B.R.Arrill. & Izag.) Essi, Longhi-Wagner & Souza-Chies; Lombardochloa rufa var. sparsepilosa (Roseng., B.R.Arrill. & Izag.) Roseng. & B.R.Arrill.; Poidium rufum (J.Presl) Matthei

Genus of grasses

Lombardochloa is a genus of grasses. It includes a single species, Lombardochloa rufa, a perennial native to southern Brazil, northeastern Argentina, Uruguay, and Peru.
