= List of web service protocols =

The following is a list of web service protocols.

- BEEP – Blocks Extensible Exchange Protocol
- CTS – Canonical Text Services Protocol
- E-Business XML
- Hessian
- Internet Open Trading Protocol
- JSON-RPC
- JSON-WSP
- SOAP – outgrowth of XML-RPC, originally an acronym for Simple Object Access Protocol
- Universal Description, Discovery, and Integration (UDDI)
- WebSocket
- Web Processing Service (WPS)
- WSCL – Web Services Conversation Language
- WSFL – Web Services Flow Language (superseded by BPEL)
- XINS Standard Calling Convention – HTTP parameters in (GET/POST/HEAD), POX out
- XLANG – XLANG-Specification (superseded by BPEL)
- XML-RPC – XML Remote Procedure Call

== See also ==
- List of web service frameworks
- List of web service specifications
- Service-oriented architecture
- Web service
