= Colin Robbins (software engineer) =

UK network protocol and software engineer (born 1964)

Colin Robbins (born 1964) is a network protocol and software engineer credited for research work in distributed directory systems and a co-inventor of LDAP. Educated at Alleyn's School, he holds a BSc, Computer Science & Electronic Engineering, with first class honours, from University College London.

Robbins developed the Quipu directory part of the ISO Development Environment (ISODE) while a research assistant at UCL working for Peter Kirstein, he became custodian of ISODE from Marshall Rose in 1991. Quipu was used to prototype DIXIE and DASED, which merged to invent LDAP of which Robbins wrote the String Representation of Standard Attribute Syntaxes element defined in RFCs 1448 and 1778 published by the IETF. Robbins wrote part 3 of Steve Kille's book Implementing X.400 and X.500: the PP and QUIPU Systems.

Robbins was the Technical Architect and Vice-Chairman of the Europe-wide Nameflow Paradise directory, the world’s largest distributed deployment of X.500. He also led the Electronic Messaging Association's (EMA) world directory challenge for which he received the EMA's distinguished service award (1997), and led the European Electronic Messaging Association (EEMA) Security Challenge for which Robbins was awarded EEMA personality of the year (1998).

Robbins is chartered by the Institute of Directors, serving of the Boards of Nexor and the Information Assurance Advisory Council (IAAC), as a sponsor member. He was co-chair of the Information Assurance Collaboration Group (IACG) 2012-2014. He is Water Polo coach and vice-chair at Nottingham Leander Swimming Club.
