= White pages (disambiguation) =

The white pages is a listing of telephone subscribers in a telephone directory.

White pages may also refer to:

- White Pages (UDDI), a protocol used to discover Web Services
- Whitepages (company), a provider of contact information for people and businesses in the US
- whitepages.com.au, an online searchable Sensis directory of contact information for businesses, government departments, organisations, and people in Australia
- White pages schema, a data model used for organizing the data contained in a directory service

== See also ==
- Yellow Pages (disambiguation)
- Green Pages
- Blue pages
- Directory (databases)
- Common Indexing Protocol
- Digital identity
