= The Wollongong Group =

The Wollongong Group, Inc. (TWG), was one of the first companies to sell commercial software products based on the Unix operating system. It was founded to market a port of Unix Version 6 developed by researchers at the University of Wollongong, Australia (thus the name "Wollongong Group"). The company was active in Palo Alto, California from 1980 to 1995.

It later achieved name recognition as a pioneer in developing and selling commercial versions of the TCP/IP protocols. The Wollongong Group had annual sales of $40 million and employed 165 people when it was acquired by former competitor Attachmate in 1995.

== Commercializing TCP/IP and the Internet ==
Virtually all Wollongong's products were initially based on versions of software that had been developed at Universities and released into the public domain. Wollongong products included:

- Eunice - A UNIX emulator for the VAX VMS operating system (based on software written by David Kashtan at SRI)
- individual TCP/IP packages for:
  - the VAX VMS operating system (based on Berkeley TCP/IP)
  - AT&T UNIX Version 7. (also based on Berkeley TCP/IP)
  - the IBM PC (Based on MIT PC-IP by John Romkey)

Individual licensing arrangements were made with brand-name vendors such as Philips for the P9000 Unix offerings, and Cray Research.

These products, which they advertised in publications such as Computerworld and Hardcopy, were among the first commercially supported systems of their type, allowing people other than software developers access to the Internet. The PC product in particular made it possible for a non-technical user to access the Internet with equipment costing less than $3000 - about one tenth the cost of any other available systems at the time.

== Original Internet work ==
PATHway was the name they used for a specialized TCP/IP product.

By the mid 1980s many Wollongong employees were active in developing new Internet Technologies. Wollongong Employees produced the first Internet tunneling specification (RFC1088) and the first SNMP MIB (RFC1066). Notable Wollongong technical staff that worked on these projects include David H. Crocker (Email), Dr. Marshall Rose (SNMP, ISO Development Environment), Karl Auerbach (Netbios, SNMP), Narayan Mohanram (TCP/IP on UNIX), Jerry Scott (TCP/IP on VMS), Leo McLaughlin III and John Bartas (TCP/IP on IBM PC). Internet Technology companies founded by ex-Wollongong employees include Epilogue Technologies, Taos Mountain Software, Interniche Technologies and iPass Inc.

=== ISO protocols ===
In the late 1980s and early 1990s, a Wollongong project sought to offer a commercially supported version of the ISODE suite. The product line included implementations of X.25, X.400 e-mail (based on PP), and X.500 directory services (based on Quipu).

The e-mail suite was to be named Pathway Messaging System.

The project was canceled in August 1994.
