= Colin Robbins =

Colin Robbins might refer to:

- Colin Robbins (Beverly Hills 90210) character
- Colin Robbins (software engineer)
- Colin Robbins (tennis), South African tennis player
