= XML Interface for Network Services =

XINS
- Developer: Online Breedband B.V.
- Release: 11/16/2004
- Stable release: 3.1 (February 22, 2013; 13 years ago) [±]
- Preview release: 3.0 beta 2 (June 9, 2012; 14 years ago) [±]
- Written in: Java
- Operating system: Cross-platform
- Available in: English
- Type: Web services
- License: BSD
- Website: xins.org
- Repository: github.com/japplis/xins

XML Interface for Network Services (XINS) is an open-source technology for definition and implementation of internet applications, which enforces a specification-oriented approach.

== Specification-oriented approach ==
The specification-oriented approach is at the heart of XINS:

- first specifications need to be written;
- then documentation and code is generated from these specifications;
- then both testing and implementation can start.

From specifications, XINS is able to generate:

- HTML documentation
- test forms
- SOAP-compliant WSDL
- a basic Java web application
- unit test code (in Java)
- stubs (in Java)
- client-side code (in Java)

== Components of the XINS technology ==
Technically, XINS is composed of the following:

- An XML-based specification format for projects, APIs, functions, types and error codes
- A POX-style RPC protocol (called the XINS Standard Calling Convention), compatible with web browsers (HTTP parameters in, XML out).
- A tool for generating human-readable documentation, from the specifications.
- A tool for generating WSDL, from the specifications.
- A Log4j-based technology for logging (called Logdoc), offering a specification format, internationalization of log messages, generation of HTML documentation and generation of code.
- A Java library for calling XINS functions, the XINS/Java Client Framework; in xins-client.jar.
- A server-side container for Java-based XINS API implementations, the XINS/Java Server Framework; in xins-server.jar. This is like a servlet container for XINS APIs.
- A Java library with some common functionality, used by both the XINS/Java Client Framework and the XINS/Java Server Framework: the XINS/Java Common Library, in xins-common.jar.

An introductory tutorial called the XINS Primer takes the reader by the hand with easy-to-follow steps to perform, with screenshots.

Since version 1.3.0, the XINS/Java Server Framework supports not only POX-style calls, but also SOAP and XML-RPC. And it supports conversion using XSLT. As of version 2.0, it also supports JSON and JSON-RPC.

XINS is open-source and is distributed under the liberal BSD license.

== Specifications ==
All XINS specification files are Plain Old XML. Compared to SOAP/WSDL/UDDI/etc. the format is extremely simple. There are specifications for projects, environment lists, APIs, functions, types and error codes.

Below is an example of a XINS project definition.

<project name="MyProject" domain="com.mycompany">
  <api name="MyAPI">
    <impl/>
    <environments/>
  </api>
</project>

Here is an example of a specification of an environment list:

<environments>
  <environment id="netarray" url="http://xins.users.mcs2.netarray.com/myproject/xins/"/>
</environments>

An example of an API specification file:

<api name="MyAPI">
  <description>My first XINS API</description>
  <function name="Hello"/>
</api>

An example of a function definition:

<function name="Hello">
  <description>Greets the indicated person.</description>
  <input>
    <param name="name" required="true">
      <description>The name of the person to be greeted.</description>
    </param>
  </input>
  <output>
    <param name="greeting" required="true">
      <description>The constructed greeting.</description>
    </param>
  </output>
</function>

== RPC protocol ==
The XINS Standard Calling Convention is a simple HTTP-based RPC protocol. Input consists of HTTP parameters, while output is an XML document. This approach makes it compatible with plain Web browsers.

Example of a request:

http://somehost/someapi/?_convention=_xins-std&_function=SayHello&firstName=John&lastName=Doe[permanent dead link]

Example of a successful response:

<result>
   <param name="greeting">Hello John Doe!</param>
</result>

== Competition ==
There are no known products that provide an integrated approach to specification-oriented development, similar to XINS. However, there are several frameworks and libraries that provide functionality similar to individual parts of XINS, including:

- JWSDP: Collection of various XML and SOAP technologies for the Java programming language.
- Apache Axis: Java-based framework for SOAP implementations.
- Codehaus XFire: Idem.
- Hessian Web Service Protocol: Binary alternative to the XINS Standard Calling Convention.
