= Common Indexing Protocol =

The Common Indexing Protocol (CIP) was an attempt by the Internet Engineering Task force's (IETF) working group FIND during the mid-1990s to define a protocol for exchanging index information between directory services. The working group was chaired by Patrik Fältström and Roland Hedberg.

== Background ==
The Fascicle Management and Interchange System for National Directories (FIND) working group was created in October 1995 and concluded in August 1999. In September of that year, a complete suite of RFCs was released to standardize the protocol.

In the X.500 Directory model, searches scoped near the root of the tree (e.g. at a particular country) were problematic to implement, as potentially hundreds or thousands of directory servers would need to be contacted in order to handle that query.

The indexes contained summaries or subsets of information about individuals and organizations represented in a white pages schema. By merging subsets of information from multiple sources, it was hoped that an index server holding that subset could be able to process a query more efficiently by chaining it only to some of the sources: those sources which did not hold information would not be contacted. For example, if a server holding the base entry for a particular country were provided with a list of names of all the people in all the entries in that country subtree, then that server would be able to process a query searching for a person with a particular name by only chaining it to those servers which held data about such a person.

The protocol evolved from earlier work developing WHOIS++, and was intended to be capable of interconnecting services from both the evolving WHOIS, and LDAP activities.

This protocol has not seen much recent deployment, as WHOIS and LDAP environments have followed separate evolution paths. WHOIS deployments are typically in domain name registrars, and its data management issues have been addressed through specifications for domain name registry interconnection such as CRISP. In contrast, enterprises that manage employee, customer or student identity data in an LDAP directory have looked to federation protocols for interconnection between organizations.

== RFCs ==
- RFC 2651 The Architecture of the Common Indexing Protocol (CIP)
- RFC 2652 MIME Object Definitions for the Common Indexing Protocol (CIP)
- RFC 2653 CIP Transport Protocols
- RFC 2654 A Tagged Index Object for use in the Common Indexing Protocol
- RFC 2655 CIP Index Object Format for SOIF Objects
- RFC 2656 Registration Procedures for SOIF Template Types
- RFC 2657 LDAPv2 Client vs the Index Mesh

== See also ==
- Development of Common Indexing Protocol
