= ISODE =

Isode or ISODE may mean:

- ISO Development Environment (ISODE), an implementation of the OSI upper layer protocols which was widely used in the Internet research community during the late 1980s and early 1990s.
- isode or iso'de is the name of the communal dwellings of the Piaroa, an indigenous American ethnic group living along the banks of the Orinoco River in Venezuela.
