= Wengyik Yeong =

American computer scientist

- Born: July 28, 1966; Georgetown, Penang, Malaysia
- Died: October 2007 (aged 41); Lower Paxton, Pennsylvania
- Citizenship: United States of America
- Education: Rensselaer Polytechnic Institute
- Known for: Lightweight Directory Access Protocol
- Scientific career
- Fields: Computer Science
- Workplaces: PSINet

Wengyik 'Weng' Yeong (1966–2007) was an American computer scientist. He is principally known for his work on the X.500, LDAP, and SNMP Internet protocols.

He also authored and edited several Internet Engineering Task Force Requests for comments (RFCs), including the original specification for LDAP.
