= ISO Development Environment =

The ISODE software (pronounced eye-soo-dee-eee), more formally the ISO Development Environment, was an implementation of the OSI upper layer protocols, from transport layer to application layer, which was used in the Internet research community to experiment with implementation and deployment of OSI during the late 1980s and early 1990s.

The ISODE software was initially a public domain / open source implementation, led by Marshall Rose. Following version 6.0, Marshall handed the lead over to Colin Robbins and Julian Onions, who coordinated the 7.0 and 8.0 releases. Version 8.0 was the final public domain release, made on June 19, 1992. The Open Source version is still available, even if only for historic interest. The software was ported to a wide set of Unix and Linux variants.

== ISODE Stack ==
The ISODE stack was an implementation of layers 3 to 6 of the OSI model. While the ISODE implementation could be configured to use one of several X.25 (CONS) or connectionless lower layer protocols, many ISODE deployments were based on RFC1006, the implementation of OSI transport protocol TP0 as a layer atop TCP, in order to use IP-based networks which were becoming increasingly common. The stack also implemented an ASN.1 compiler.

== Applications ==
The ISODE Stack was the basis for a number of OSI applications.

=== PP ===
ISODE formed the basis an implementation for the X.400 email protocol, called PP. (Note: PP does not stand for anything. It was a project joke that it did not stand for "Postman Pat", while "Postman Pat" is a good description of the software, it would have created copyright issues to have used this name.) PP included a fully operational SMTP/MIME email server and an X.400/SMTP Mixer gateway. PP also implemented a P7 Messagestore (PPMS).

PP was designed by Steve Kille and the lead engineer was Julian Onions.

=== Quipu ===
ISODE had a full X.500 and LDAP directory called QUIPU (incorrectly pronounced kwip-ooo by the project). Quipu implemented a DSA and a Directory User Agent (DUA) called DISH. X.500 was considered too heavyweight to access directories, Colin Robbins implemented a proprietary protocol to solve the problem, this was then significantly re-worked by Tim Howes for DIXIE which led to the development of the Lightweight Directory Access Protocol.

QUIPU was designed by Kille and the lead engineer was Robbins, largely funded by the INCA project, and used extensively in the Paradise academic X.500 directory pilot.

=== FTAM ===
ISODE contained and implementation of FTAM, and implemented an FTAM-FTP gateway.

=== VT ===
ISODE contained a virtual terminal (VT) implementation and a VT-Telnet gateway.

=== OSISEC ===
ISODE has a full implementation of a PKI Certificate Authority built on top of it by the OSISEC project. OSISEC was developed by Mike Roe & Peter Williams and integrated into ISODE by Robbins.

=== OSIMIS ===
ISODE has a full implementation of a CMIP/TMN built on top of it by the OSIMIS project.

== Contributors ==
The following people or groups were listed in the ISODE 8.0 manual as the significant contributors

- The MITRE Corporation
- The Northrop Corporation
- NYSERNet, Inc.
- Performance Systems International, Inc.
- University College London
- The University of Nottingham
- X-Tel Services Ltd (now Nexor)
- The Wollongong Group, Inc.
- Marshall T. Rose
- Colin J. Robbins
- Julian P. Onions

== Commercialisation ==
Several companies used the ISODE software to build successful commercial products and services including (alphabetical order):

- Control Data Corporation used Quipu as the basis of their X.500 product.
- Nexor's email and directory and products are evolutions of PP and Quipu.
- X-Tel Services offered commercial support contracts for the software to the academic community, including JANET and SURFnet.
