= Nottingham Leander Swimming Club =

Swimming club in Nottingham, England

Club information
- Full name: Nottingham Leander Swimming Club
- Short name: Nottingham Leander
- City: Nottingham
- Founded: 1947
- Home pool(s): Harvey Hadden Sports Village, Nottingham
- Chairman: Joseph Bailey

Swimming
- Head coach: Wayne Cummings
- Swim cap design: Green with Octopus Logo in White
- League: Speedo League

Water Polo
- Name: Nottingham Leander Water Polo
- Head coach: Colin Robbins

Masters swimming
- Name: Nottingham Leander Master
- Founded: 1991
- Head coach: Alex Thurston

Nottingham Leander Swimming Club is a volunteer-run competitive swimming club in Nottingham.

They have been accredited with the Amateur Swimming Association (ASA) as a swim21 club. These kitemarks indicate that the club provide a safe sporting environment for swimmers of all ages and follow best practice in child protection, club administration, coach education, and swimmer development.

The club takes its name from the Greek Myth of Hero and Leander.

== History ==
- NLSC was formed in 1947/48 as a male only club and affiliated to the A.S.A. Midland District and the Notts. A.S.A.
- From September 1952 the club established a committee and officers being voted for annually at an AGM.
- In 1958 the Chief Coach, Bill Henson, left to form the Nottingham Falcon Swimming Club taking a good number of club members with him.
- 1966 female members accepted
- In July 1981 Tony Holmes was appointed as Chief Coach. Tony died in 2013 following a short illness, age 56.
- April 2009 saw a pinnacle reached with the club competing in the National Swimming League Cup Final (previously Speedo) at Ponds Forge, the first Notts club in over 20 years to reach this level, finishing 9th. This was without the services of Rebecca Adlington who pulled out with a stomach bug the night before.
- 2011, Master swimmer Chris Sheppard, swims the Gibraltar Strait
- In 2014, Maggie Kelly became head coach.
- November 2014, Leander Masters Relay team break world record for 120+ yrs Age Group world 4x200m Mixed Freestyle.

== Water polo ==
- NLSC has a Water polo section, under head coach Colin Robbins, playing in the local Nottinghamshire league, and feeding players into other clubs to play at a higher level.

== Notable associates ==
- Rebecca Adlington
- June Croft has swum for Leander in masters events
- Paul Easter
- Kathryn Evans
- Maggie Kelly

== See also ==
- Sport in Nottingham
