= Directory Access Protocol =

Directory Access Protocol (DAP) is a computer networking standard promulgated by ITU-T and ISO in 1988 for accessing an X.500 directory service. DAP was intended to be used by client computer systems, but was not popular as there were few implementations of the full OSI protocol stack for desktop computers available to be run on the hardware and operating systems typical of that time. The basic operations of DAP: Bind, Read, List, Search, Compare, Modify, Add, Delete and ModifyRDN, were adapted for the Novell Directory Services (NDS) and the TCP/IP-based Lightweight Directory Access Protocol (LDAP).

DAP is specified in X.511.
