= Sport in Nottingham =

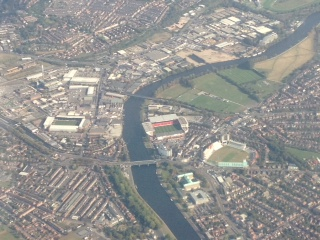
Aerial view of the River Trent in Nottingham showing the County Ground, City Ground and Trent Bridge cricket ground.

Nottingham is home to several high-profile sports clubs. These include two notable Football League clubs in the shape of Nottingham Forest which, along with Liverpool, is one of only two clubs in England to have won consecutive European Cups and Notts County which is the oldest professional football club in the world. Nottinghamshire County Cricket Club is a top level county cricket club, whilst the National Ice Centre, the National Watersports Centre and the Nottingham Hockey Centre are also located in the city.

== Football ==
=== Nottingham Forest F.C. ===
Nottingham Forest are currently members of the English Premier League (the top tier of English football). They are best remembered for their success under Brian Clough, who was manager from 1975 to 1993 and guided them to a Football League title, two European Cups and four League Cups. The club has been based at the City Ground, which stands in West Bridgford on the banks of the River Trent, for over a century.

=== Notts County F.C. ===
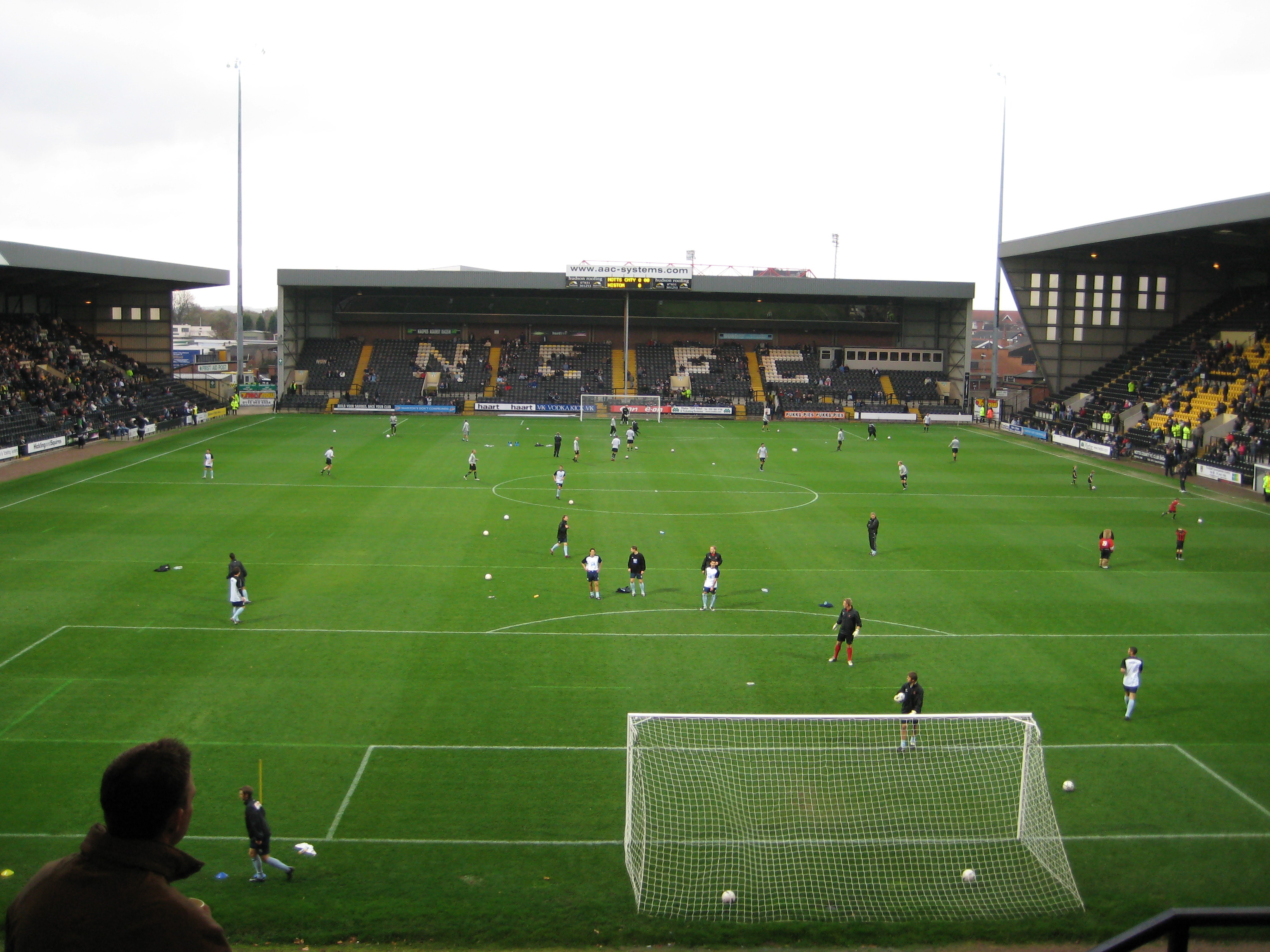
Meadow Lane viewed from the Kop

Notts County, who play at Meadow Lane stadium on the opposite side of the River Trent to Nottingham Forest, is the oldest professional Football League team in the world, having been founded in 1862 – a year before the establishment of the Football Association. They were founder members of the Football League in 1888 and won the FA Cup in 1894, but have spent most of their history outside the top flight of English football, the most recent spell ending in 1992 after just one season. The club's most notable manager was Jimmy Sirrel who oversaw the elevation of Notts County from Division Four strugglers to an established Division Two side.

=== 2018 FIFA World Cup ===
In December 2009, Nottingham was selected by the FA as a candidate host city in England's 2018 FIFA World Cup Bid. If the English bid had been successful, a new stadium would have been built, exceeding FIFA's 40,000 capacity requirement. The bid was unsuccessful, Russia was selected as the host of the 2018 FIFA World Cup.

== Cricket ==
=== Trent Bridge Cricket Ground ===
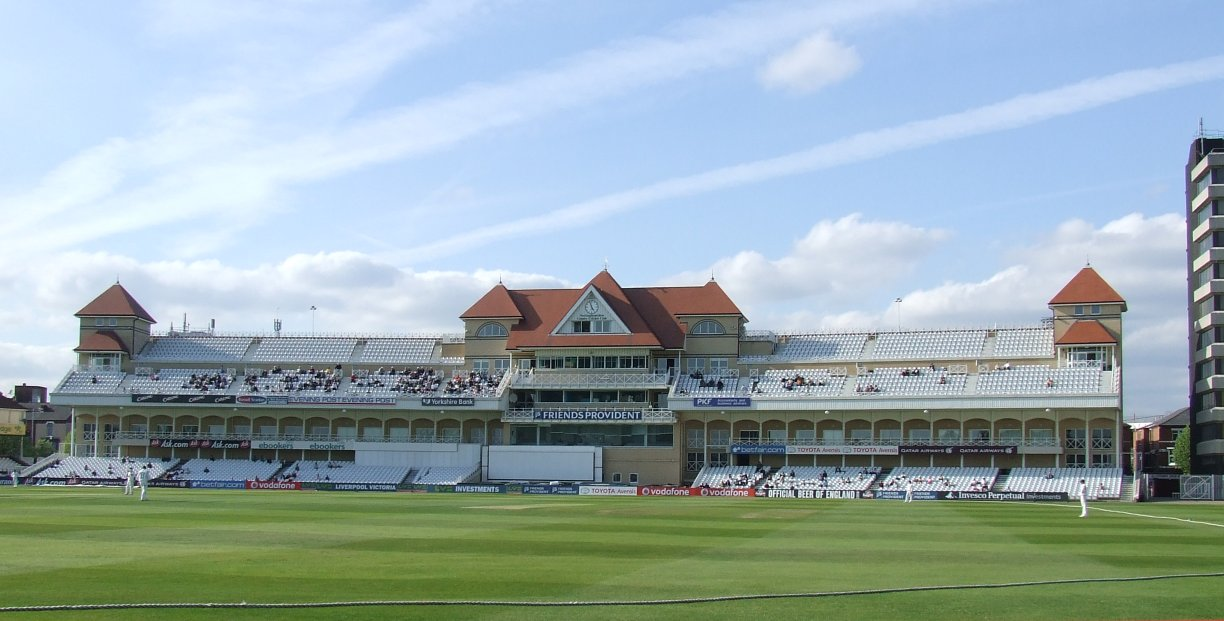
The Radcliffe Road End at Trent Bridge

Trent Bridge cricket ground, located across the river in West Bridgford, Rushcliffe, is the home of Nottinghamshire County Cricket Club, who were winners of the 2005 County Championship and runners-up in the 2006 Twenty20 cup competition. Trent Bridge is a major venue for international Test matches, and also hosts other important cricketing events such as the Twenty20 cup finals and regular One Day International games. The ground, which has won architectural awards for the design of some of its newer stands, also houses a cricket academy, a hotel, and a gym, and also uniquely features not one, but two public houses built within the ground itself, most famously the world-renowned Trent Bridge Inn.

== National Ice Centre ==
The National Ice Centre consists of two ice rinks, one of which is olympic-sized; the city's links to ice skating can be traced back to arguably its most famous children of recent times, Olympic ice dancing champions Jayne Torvill and Christopher Dean who collected a unanimous 6.0 score at the 1984 Winter Olympics at Sarajevo. The NIC is used as a training and competition venue for speed skating, sledge hockey and figure skating and receives an annual grant from bodies such as Sport England to maintain and fund these sports.

The NIC is the home of the Nottingham Panthers ice hockey team, founded in 1946. The team are currently managed by Canadian Danny Stewart who coached Newcastle Vipers, Fife Flyers and Coventry blaze. In April 2025 it was announced that Stewart would remain as Panthers head coach for the 2025/2026 season. There is a thriving junior ice hockey programme which is also based at the centre. Since 2001, Nottingham has been the host city of the annual ice hockey Play-off Championship Finals weekend, which attracts fans from many different parts of the country. Also calling the NIC home is the Nottingham North Stars recreational ice hockey team. Founded in 1989 North Stars are one of the oldest recreational clubs in the country.

== Rugby Union ==
The city's rugby union side, Nottingham Rugby are currently members of the RFU Championship (the second tier of rugby union in England). In January 2015 they moved back to Lady Bay Sports Ground from Meadow Lane.

== Rugby League ==
Nottingham is home to the Nottingham Outlaws RLFC who were recently added to the National conference league which is the fourth tier of English rugby league. They train regularly throughout the summer at Lady Bay (also known as 'the Bay') and have a number of junior teams.

== Boxing ==
Nottingham is the home town of two time former WBC Supermiddleweight Champion and current Unified WBA And IBF Supermiddleweight World Champion Carl "the Cobra" Froch. A fan of Nottingham Forest, Froch will often attend games at the City Ground, walking out onto the pitch after he has won a fight.

== Hockey ==
There are a number of field hockey clubs based in and around Nottingham that are part of the men's and women's national league, the Midlands Hockey League and the BUCS league structures. Current hockey clubs in and around the area are Beeston, Boots, Mansfield, Nottingham, Nottingham Players, Sikh Union (Nottingham), South Nottingham, West Bridgford, Nottingham Trent University and University of Nottingham. Some clubs are based at the Nottingham Hockey Centre.

== Tennis ==
There is a large tennis centre, where the annual Nottingham Open was held in the weeks immediately prior to Wimbledon until 2008 and has been used as warm-up practice by various tennis stars. After 2008 the tournament was replaced with the less important Aegon Nottingham Challenge.

== Squash ==
Nottingham Squash Rackets Club can trace its roots back to 1909 - when it was formed in The Park, Nottingham. The club was significantly extended in 2000 - when 10 courts were created - 6 of which are glass back. The club has over 500 members and has a team in the Professional Squash League. Since 2013/14 the team have been sponsored by Air-IT and narrowly missed out on the play-offs in that season. The club will host the European Club Championships between 3–6 September 2014. The current club Chairman is Tim Garratt FRICS. The club announced a new manager to start from 1 August 2014 - Stuart Harding. Fantasy Squash operate an office and fully stocked shop out of the club.

== National Watersports Centre ==
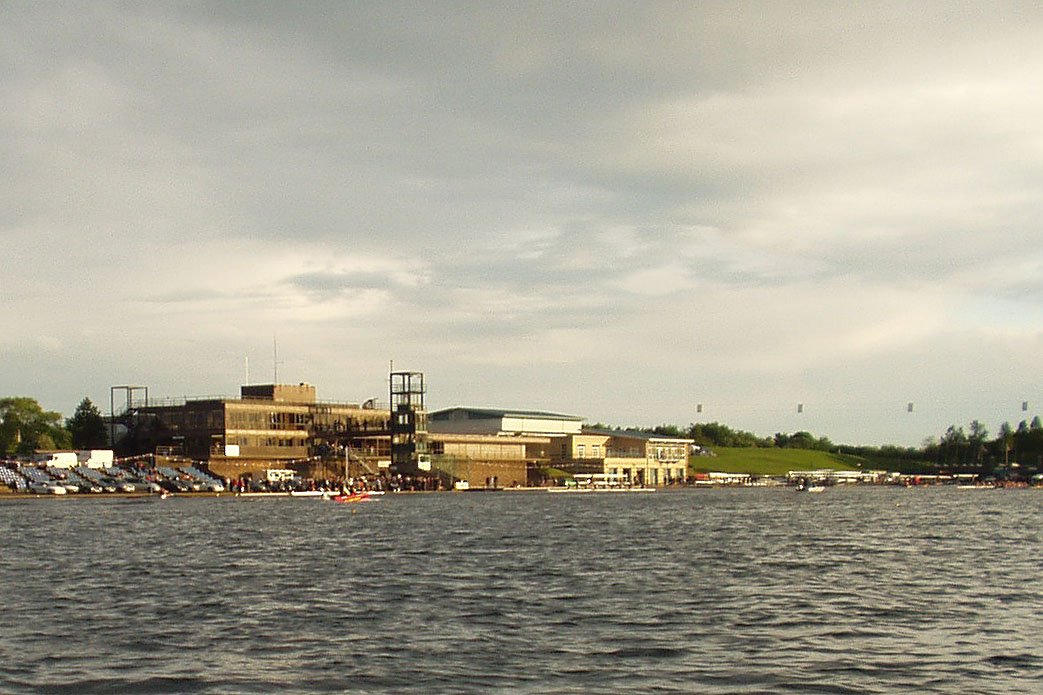
Holme Pierrepont National Watersports Centre

The National Water Sports Centre is based at Holme Pierrepont, with a 2000-metre regatta lake for rowing, canoeing and sailing, and a white water slalom canoe course fed from the river. A number of other sailing, rowing and canoeing clubs are also based along the River Trent, as is the boatbuilder Raymond Sims. The centre hosted the 1981 ICF Canoe Sprint and 1995 ICF Canoe Slalom World Championships and was the training base for the highly successful Nottinghamshire County Rowing Association.

== Robin Hood Marathon ==
Every year since 1981 Nottingham has played host to the 'Robin Hood Marathon' taking in many of the city's historic and scenic sights. The race is run alongside a half marathon and a fun run among other events. The 2009 event took place on Sunday 13 September.

== Motorsport ==
- Motorcycle speedway racing was staged in Nottingham before the Second World War. The original venue known as Olympic Speedway was redeveloped by the building of the White City stadium which also featured speedway. A book by Philip Dalling, published by Tempus Publishing, chronicles speedway events in Nottingham. In 1979 and 1980, the team based at Long Eaton raced under the name Nottingham Outlaws.
- The city hosted the RAC Rally in 1985 and 1989.

== Other ==
- Nottingham is home to the American football team Nottingham Caesars, who have recently been promoted to British American Football League (BAFL) First Division. In 2009, they started a youth kitted team which is currently an associate member of the BAFL Youth League.
- Nottingham has four roller derby teams: Nottingham Roller Girls and Hellfire Harlots (women's teams), Super Smash Brollers (men's team) and Nottingham Outlaws (men's team).
- Nottingham hosted the UFC in 2012.
- Nottingham Leander Swimming Club is the largest swimming and water polo club in Nottingham. Their goal is to promote and take part in competitive swimming and water polo. All Club teaching/coaching processes are devised with this aim in mind and all swimmers are taught the correct techniques to achieve maximum potential. In due course, it is expected that members achieving the necessary standards will swim for the Club teams in appropriate events.
- Nottingham Underwater Hockey Club is an underwater hockey club based at the Harvey Hadden Stadium.
- Nottingham has two boat clubs, the Nottingham Rowing Club and the Nottingham and Union Rowing Club, both located on the banks of the river Trent adjacent to the City Ground.
