= LDAP Application Program Interface =

The LDAP Application Program Interface, described by RFC 1823, is an Informational RFC that specifies an application programming interface in the C programming language for version 2 of the Lightweight Directory Access Protocol. Version 2 of LDAP is historic. Commonly available LDAP C APIs do not strictly adhere to this specification.

A draft standard is under development for LDAP version 3.
