= Federated Naming Service =

Directory service protocol

In computing, the Federated Naming Service (FNS) or XFN (X/Open Federated Naming) is a system for uniting various name services under a single interface for the basic naming operations. It is produced by X/Open and included in various Unix operating systems, primarily Solaris versions 2.5 to 9.

The purpose of XFN and FNS is to allow applications to use widely heterogeneous naming services (such as NIS, DNS and so on) via a single interface, to avoid duplication of programming effort.

Unlike the similar LDAP, neither XFN nor FNS were ever popular nor widely used. FNS was last included in Solaris 9 and was not included with Solaris 10.

== External links and references ==
- Overview of FNS (Solaris 9 man page)
- Overview of the XFN interface (Solaris 9 man page)
- Martin, Elizabeth A. (December 1995). "X/Open Federated Naming - specification for uniform naming interfaces between multiple naming systems". Hewlett-Packard Journal. 46 (6). Archived from the original on August 30, 2004 – via FindArticles.
- Federated Naming Service Programming Guide (Sun Microsystems 816–1470–10, September 2002)
