= Directory System Agent =

IT standard, part of X.500

A Directory System Agent (DSA) is the element of an X.500 directory service that provides User Agents with access to a portion of the directory (usually the portion associated with a single Organizational Unit). X.500 is an international standard developed by the International Organization for Standardization (ISO), and the International Telecommunication Union (ITU-T). The model and function of a directory system agent are specified in ITU-T Recommendation X.501.

== Active Directory ==
In Microsoft's Active Directory the DSA is a collection of servers and daemon processes that run on Windows Server systems that provide various means for clients to access the Active Directory data store.

Clients connect to an Active Directory DSA using various communications protocols:

- LDAP version 3.0—used by Windows 2000 and Windows XP clients
- LDAP version 2.0
- Security Account Manager (SAM) interface—used by Windows NT clients
- MAPI RPC interface—used by Microsoft Exchange Server and other MAPI clients
- A proprietary RPC interface—used by Active Directory DSAs to communicate with one another and replicate data amongst themselves

== RFCs ==
- RFC 2148 — Deployment of the Internet White Pages Service
