= Web Services Flow Language =

Web Services Flow Language 1.0 (WSFL) was an XML programming language proposed by IBM in 2001 for describing Web services compositions. Language considered two types of compositions. The first type was for describing business processes as a collection of web services and the second was for describing interactions between partners. WSFL was proposed to be layered on top of Web Services Description Language.

In 2003 IBM and Microsoft combined WSFL and Xlang to BPEL4WS and submitted it to OASIS for standardization. Oasis published BPEL4WS as WS-BPEL to properly fit the naming of other WS-* standards.

== Web Services Endpoint Language (WSEL) ==
Web Services Endpoint Language (WSEL) was an XML format proposed to be used to description of non-operational characteristics of service endpoints, such as quality-of-service, cost, or security properties. Format was proposed as a part of report which published Web Service Flow Language . It never gained wide acceptance.
