= Steve Kille =

English software engineer

Steve Kille is an English software engineer.

He has worked on Internet technologies since 1980, and was one of the principal engineers behind the ISO Development Environment (ISODE) open-source implementation of the OSI protocol stack.

He was born in London, had his Master's in physics from Oxford University, and a master's in electrical engineering from Manchester University and Stanford University (the latter being attended on a Fulbright scholarship).

From 1981 to 1992, he was a researcher at University College London, focusing on research into network-based applications.

He founded Isode Limited in 1992, focusing on high end messaging and directory products, initially employing the ISODE codebase.

In 1999, he managed the merger of ISODE to form MessagingDirect, and subsequently spent two years in California. In 2001, MessagingDirect was acquired by ACI Worldwide, and Steve re-launched Isode in 2002, again focusing on X.400 and directory products.

Steve is the author of at least 32 IETF RFCs, has published one book, "Implementing X.400 and X.500: the PP and QUIPU Systems" (ISBN 9780890065648), and has contributed to several others.
