= DIXIE =

DIXIE is an obsolete protocol for accessing X.500 directory services. DIXIE was intended to provide a lightweight means for clients to access X.500 directory services. DIXIE allowed TCP/IP clients to connect a DIXIE-to-DAP gateway which would provide access to the X.500 Directory Service. This design allows the client to access the directory without requiring it to support the cumbersome Open Systems Interconnection protocol stack.

DIXIE was created in 1990 at the University of Michigan by Tim Howes, Mark Smith, and Bryan Beecher. DIXIE was formally specified in RFC 1249, published in 1991. The university offered a completed UNIX implementation of the protocol, including a DIXIE server, an application development library, and DIXIE clients. A DIXIE client for Apple Macintosh was also provided.

These efforts led to the development of the Lightweight Directory Access Protocol. LDAP replaced DIXIE.

When created, the acronym DIXIE did not stand for anything, however later it became known to stand for Directory Interface to X.500 Implemented Efficiently.
