= Plain Old XML =

Plain Old XML (POX) is the basic XML, sometimes mixed in with other, blendable specifications like XML Namespaces, Dublin Core, XInclude and XLink. This contrasts with complicated, multilayered XML specifications like those for web services or RDF. The term may have been derived from or inspired by the expression plain old telephone service (POTS) and, similarly Plain Old Java Object (POJO).

An interesting question is how POX relates to XML Schema. On the one hand, POX is completely compatible with XML Schema. However, many POX users eschew XML Schema to avoid the poor or inconsistent quality of XML Schema-to-Java tools.

POX is complementary to REST: REST refers to a communication pattern, while POX refers to an information format style.

The primary competitors to POX are more strictly defined XML-based information formats such as RDF and SOAP section 5 encoding, as well as general non-XML information formats such as JSON and CSV.
