= Marshall Rose =

American network protocol and software engineer

Marshall T. Rose
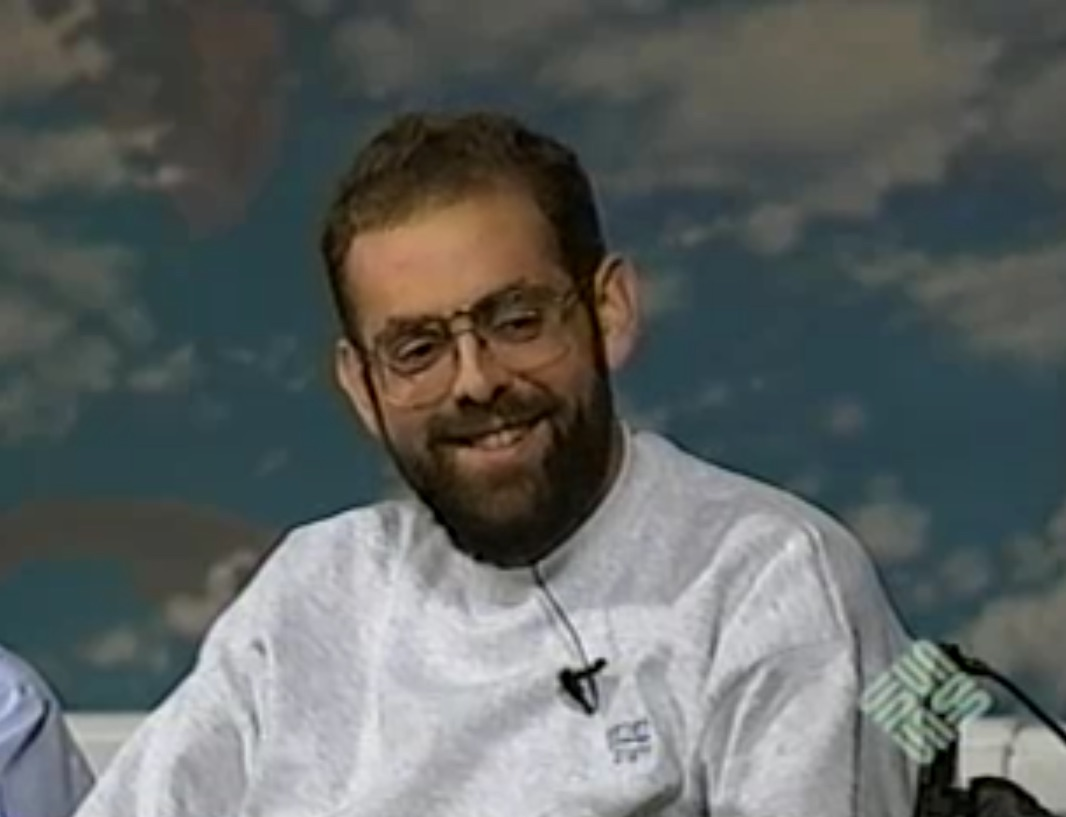
- Rose in 1993
- Born: Marshall T. Rose; September 17, 1961 (age 64)
- Education: Ph.D. in Information and Computer Science
- Alma mater: University of California, Irvine
- Occupations: Engineer, Protocol Designer
- Years active: 1984–present
- Employer: Brave
- Known for: Contributions to the Internet Engineering Task Force (IETF), BEEP, Simple Network Management Protocol (SNMP), Simple Mail Transfer Protocol (SMTP), and other internet protocols
- Title: Principal Engineer

Marshall Toufic Rose (born 1961) is an American network protocol and software engineer, author, and speaker who has contributed to the Internet Engineering Task Force (IETF), the Internet, and Internet and network applications. More specifically, he has specialized in network management, distributed systems management, applications management, email, the ISO Development Environment (ISODE), and service-oriented architecture (SOA).

Rose holds a Ph.D. in Information and Computer Science from the University of California, Irvine and is former area director for network management of the IETF.

Rose is presently Principal Engineer at Brave (web browser).

== IETF ==
Rose's work on behalf of the Internet Engineering Task Force has included:

- Area Director for network management, 1993-1995.
- Chair, MARID, MTA Authorization Records in DNS. IETF working group, Applications area. Concluded September 2004.
- Chair, OPES, Open Pluggable Edge Services. IETF working group, Applications area.
- Chair, POP, Post Office Protocol. IETF working group, Applications area. Concluded April 1993.
- Chair, SNMP, Simple Network Management Protocol. IETF working group, Network Management area. Concluded November 1991.

== Books ==
Rose has written the following published books:

- Rose, Marshall T. (2002). BEEP: The Definitive Guide. O'Reilly Media, Inc. ISBN 0-596-00244-0.
- Rose, Marshall T.; McCloghrie, Keith (1995). How to Manage Your Network Using SNMP. PTR Prentice Hall. ISBN 0-13-141517-4.
- How to Manage Your Network Using SNMP: The Networking Management Practicum. ISBN 0-13-145117-0.
- Rose, Marshall T.; Strom, David (1998). Internet Messaging: From the Desktop to the Enterprise. Prentice Hall. ISBN 0-13-978610-4.
- Lynch, Daniel C.; Rose, Marshall (1993). Internet System Handbook. Addison-Wesley. ISBN 0-201-56741-5.
- Rose, Marshall T. (1993). The Internet Message: Closing the Book With Electronic Mail (Prentice Hall Series in Innovative Technology). PTR Prentice Hall. ISBN 0-13-092941-7.
- Rose, Marshall T. (1990). The Open Book : A Practical Perspective on OSI. Prentice Hall. ISBN 0-13-643016-3.
- Rose, Marshall T. (1996). The Simple Book: An Introduction to Internet Management, Revised Second Edition. Prentice Hall PTR. ISBN 0-13-451659-1.
- Rose, Marshall T. (1992). The Little Black Book: Mail Bonding with OSI Directory Service. Prentice Hall. ISBN 0-13-683210-5.
