= Web Services Conversation Language =

World Wide Web service

The Web Service Conversation Language (WSCL) proposal defines the overall input and output message sequences for one web service using a finite-state automaton over the alphabet of message types.
