= Linkinus =

Shareware IRC client

- Linkinus running under Mac OS X
- Developer: Conceited Software
- Stable release: 2.4.3 (August 23, 2011; 15 years ago) [±]
- Operating system: Mac OS X & iOS
- Available in: English
- Type: IRC Client
- License: Shareware
- Website: Conceited Software

Linkinus was a shareware IRC client for Mac OS X and iOS. It has an Aqua-style user interface, and allows Cocoa plugins, AppleScript, and Growl notifications to be used. Linkinus also features embedded media, although some users have complained that this can cause the program to slow down, or even crash, especially on slow computers. Linkinus also has other features similar to those of other IRC clients, such as multitasking and the ability to change between different user interface styles.

Despite the developer tweeting in late 2012 that Linkinus was still under active development, it has not seen any updates since April 2012.

== Linkinus for iOS ==
The iOS versions have features similar to those of the Mac version, with a few exceptions such as themes and plugins. Some users are unhappy about the lack of these features, and the number of bugs in it. Users praise its well-designed interface, although some criticize its high price.

== Critical reception ==
Reviewers praise Linkinus' ease of use, and its clean user interface. Some reviewers, however, say that the user interface could be improved. For example, a lot of functions are duplicated in menus and buttons, resulting in a cluttered interface. While reviewers praise its advanced features, they also complain that some of these features are difficult to access, such as searching for servers and channels. In comparisons with similar IRC clients available for Mac, most reviewers agree that Linkinus has more features, but are dismayed by the fact that unlike most other IRC clients, Linkinus is not free.

== See also ==
- Comparison of Internet Relay Chat clients
- Colloquy
- HexChat
- Ircle
- Snak
