= Comparison of IRC clients =

The following tables compare general and technical information between a number of notable IRC client programs which have been discussed in independent, reliable prior published sources.

== General ==
Basic general information about the notable clients: creator/company, license, etc. Clients listed on a light purple background are no longer in active development.

Client	Primary developers	Distribution model	Software license	User interface	Programming language
Adium	Thijs Alkemade	Free software	GPL-2.0-or-later	GUI	Objective-C and C
AmIRC	Oliver Wagner, Nicolas Sallin, Costel Mincea	Free software	GNU General Public License	GUI	?
Bersirc	Jamie Frater, Nicholas Copeland	Free software	LGPL	GUI	C (Delphi originally)
BitchX	Colten Edwards	Free software	BSD	TUI, GUI	C
ChatZilla	James Ross, Robert Ginda, Samuel Sieb, Gijs Kruitbosch	Free software	MPL, GPL, LGPL tri-license	GUI (Note: Can be installed as part of a web browser)	JavaScript, XUL
Colloquy	Timothy Hatcher, Kiji Roshi	Free software	Desktop: GPL; Mobile: BSD	GUI	Objective-C
ERC	Alexander L. Belikoff, Sergey Berezin	Free software	GPL-3.0-or-later	TUI, GUI	Emacs Lisp
HexChat	Berke Viktor	Free software	GPL-2.0-or-later	TUI, GUI	C
Instantbird	Florian Quèze	Free software	GPL	GUI	C++, JavaScript, CSS, XUL
ircII	Michael Sandrof	Free software	BSD	TUI	C
Ircle	Onno Tijdgat	Commercial, 30-day trial	Proprietary	GUI	C
Irssi	Timo Sirainen	Free software	GPL-2.0-or-later	TUI	C
KVIrc	Szymon Stefanek	Free software	GPL	GUI	C++
Konversation	KDE	Free software	GPL-2.0-or-later	GUI	C++
LeafChat	Samuel Marshall	Free software	GPL-3.0-or-later	GUI	Java
Linkinus	Conceited Software	Commercial, 15-day trial	Proprietary	GUI	Objective-C
Mibbit	Jimmy Moore	Textual Adbar	Proprietary	Web	JavaScript frontend, Java backend
mIRC	Khaled Mardam-Bey	Shareware, 30-day trial	Proprietary	GUI	C/C++
Nettalk	Nicolas Kruse	Free software	Apache-2.0	GUI	Visual Basic
Pidgin		Free software	GPL-2.0-or-later	GUI	C
PIRCH	Northwest Computer Services	Shareware	Proprietary	GUI	Delphi
PJIRC	Philippe Detournay	Free software	GPL	GUI	Java
Quassel	Manuel Nickschas, Marcus Eggenberger, Alexander von Renteln	Free software	GPL-2.0-or-3.0	TUI (Note: Incomplete, proof of concept), GUI (Note: Separate client and daemon)	C++
rcirc	Ryan Yeske	Free software	GPL-3.0-or-later	TUI	Emacs Lisp
Smuxi	Mirco Bauer	Free software	GPL-2.0-or-later	GUI, TUI, server	C#
Snak	Kent Sorensen	Commercial	Proprietary	GUI	?
Thunderbird	Mozilla Foundation	Free software	MPL-2.0	GUI	C, C++, JavaScript
Visual IRC	Jesse McGrew	Free software	GPL	GUI	Delphi
WeeChat	Sébastien Helleu	Free software	GPL-3.0-or-later	TUI, GUI (Note: No official GUI, several options available (e.g. Glowing Bear, a web frontend))	C
XiRCON	Mark Hanson	Freeware	Proprietary	GUI	Borland C++, scripted with Tcl
Client	Primary developers	Distribution model	Software license	User interface	Programming language

== Release ==
A brief overview of the release history.

	First public release		First stable release		Latest stable release
Client	Date	Version	Date	Version	Latest stable release
AmIRC	1995				
Bersirc	1999				2.2.14 (12 August 2005; 21 years ago) [±]
BitchX	1996				1.2.1 (November 14, 2014; 11 years ago) [±]
ChatZilla	2001				0.9.93 (November 8, 2016; 9 years ago) [±]
Colloquy	2005				2.4.3 (6011) (March 22, 2014; 12 years ago) [±]
DMDirc	2007				0.7 (January 5, 2013; 13 years ago) [±]
ERC	1999?				ERC improvements are now released as part of Emacs. [±]
HexChat	2009-10-04	r249	2009-10-09	2.86.0	2.16.2 (7 February 2024; 2 years ago) [±]
ircII	1989	2.0.0	1989	2.0.0	20240918 (September 18, 2024; 2 years ago) [±]
Ircle	1995				3.5a6 (November 17, 2007; 18 years ago) [±]
Irssi	1999				1.4.5 (October 3, 2023; 3 years ago) [±]
KVIrc	1998	0.6.0	1999-12-21	1.0.0	5.2.10 (December 12, 2025; 10 months ago) [±]
Konversation	2002				1.10.24083 7 November 2024; 23 months ago
LeafChat	?	1.0			2.5 (July 29, 2012; 14 years ago) [±]
Linkinus	2007				2.4.3 (August 23, 2011; 15 years ago) [±]
Mibbit	2008				web application, no version
mIRC	1995				7.85 (9 September 2026) [±]
Nettalk	2004				6.7.16 (October 30, 2012; 14 years ago) [±]
PIRCH	1995				1.0.1.1190 (January 1, 2001; 25 years ago) [±]
PJIRC	2002				2.2.1 (November 29, 2004; 21 years ago) [±]
Quassel	2008-08-27	0.3.0			0.14.0 (January 1, 2022; 4 years ago) [±]
rcirc	?	?			rcirc improvements are now released as part of Emacs. [±]
Smuxi	2008-07-29	0.6	2010-09-03	0.8	1.2.1 (April 23, 2023; 3 years ago) [±]
Snak	1997				5.3.4 (March 11, 2012; 14 years ago) [±]
Visual IRC	1995				2.0pl2 (December 30, 2007; 18 years ago) [±]
WeeChat	2003				4.10.2 (October 31, 2026; 4 days ago) [±]
Client	Date	Version	Date	Version	Latest stable release
Client	First public release		First stable release		Latest stable release

== Operating system support ==
The operating systems on which the clients can run natively (without emulation).

Client	Windows 7, Vista	XP, 2000	NT 4.0	NT 3.x	Me, 98	95	3.1x	ReactOS	macOS (Intel/PPC)	OS 9	OS 8	System 7 (PPC/68k)	BeOS, Haiku	OS/2, eCS, ArcaOS	AmigaOS (68k)	AmigaOS 4, MorphOS (PPC)	DOS
AmIRC	No	No	No	No	No	No	No	No	No	No	No	No	No	No	Yes	Yes	No
Bersirc	Yes	Yes	?	No	?	?	No	?	?	No	No	No	No	No	No	No	No
BitchX	Yes (Note: Requires Cygwin)	Yes	Yes	No	Yes	Yes	No	?	Yes	No	No	No	?	Yes	Yes	Yes	No
ChatZilla	Yes	Yes	Yes	Yes	Yes	Yes	No	Yes	Yes	Yes	Yes	Yes	Yes	Yes	?	Yes	No
Colloquy	No	No	No	No	No	No	No	No	Yes	No	No	No	No	No	No	No	No
ERC	Yes	Yes	Yes	Yes	Yes	Yes	Yes	Terminal (unofficial)	Yes	No	No	No	Yes	Yes	?	?	Yes
HexChat	Yes	Dropped (2.9.5)	No	No	No	No	No	No	No	No	No	No	?	No	No	No	No
ircII	Yes	Yes	Yes	No	Yes	Yes	No	?	Yes	No	No	No	No	No	No	?	No
Ircle	No	No	No	No	No	No	No	No	Yes (Note: Requires OS X v10.4.3 or later)	Yes	Yes	Yes	No	No	No	No	No
Irssi	Yes	Yes	Yes	No	Yes	Yes	No	?	Yes	No	No	No	Yes	Yes	?	Yes	No
Konversation	Partial	Partial	Partial	No	Partial	Partial	No	?	Partial	No	No	No	No	No	No	No	No
KVIrc	Yes	Yes	Yes	No	Yes	No	No	Yes	Yes	Yes	No	No	No	Yes	No	No	No
LeafChat	Yes	Yes	No	No	No	No	No	No	Yes	No	No	No	No	No	No	No	No
Linkinus	No	No	No	No	No	No	No	No	Yes	No	No	No	No	No	No	No	No
Mibbit	Yes	Yes	Yes	Yes	Yes	Yes	Yes	Yes	Yes	Yes	Yes	Yes	Yes	Yes	Yes	Yes	No
mIRC	Yes	Yes	Yes	Partial	Yes	Yes	Partial	?	No	No	No	No	No	No	No	No	No
Nettalk	Yes	Yes	?	No	Yes	No	No	?	No	No	No	No	No	No	No	No	No
PIRCH	Yes	Yes	Yes	?	Yes	Yes	Yes	?	No	No	No	No	No	No	No	No	No
PJIRC	Yes	Yes	Yes	Yes	Yes	Yes	No	Yes	Yes	No	No	Yes	Yes	No	No	No	No
Quassel	Yes	Yes	No	No	No	No	No	No	Yes	No	No	No	No	Yes	No	No	No
rcirc	Yes	Yes	?	?	No	No	No	No	Yes	No	No	No	No	No	No	No	No
Smuxi	Yes	Yes	No	No	No	No	No	No	Yes	No	No	No	No	No	No	No	No
Snak	No	No	No	No	No	No	No	No	Yes	Yes	Yes	?	No	No	No	No	No
Visual IRC	Yes	Yes	Yes	No	Yes	Yes	No	?	No	No	No	No	No	No	No	No	No
WeeChat	Partial	Partial	Partial	No	Partial	Partial	No	?	Yes	No	No	No	Partial	No	No	No	No
Client	Windows 7, Vista	XP, 2000	NT 4.0	NT 3.x	Me, 98	95	3.1x	ReactOS	OS X (Intel/PPC)	OS 9	OS 8	System 7 (PPC/68k)	BeOS, Haiku	OS/2, eCS	AmigaOS (68k)	AmigaOS 4, MorphOS (PPC)	DOS

Unix and Unix-like operating systems:

- Unix (BSD): 386BSD, BSD/OS, FreeBSD, NetBSD, OpenBSD, SunOS, ULTRIX
- Unix (System V): AIX, A/UX, HP-UX, IRIX, SCO OpenServer, Solaris, UnixWare
- Unix-like: Linux, NeXTSTEP, OpenVMS, OSF/1, QNX, Tru64 UNIX

Client	386BSD	BSD/OS (BSD/386, BSDI)	FreeBSD, NetBSD, OpenBSD	SunOS	ULTRIX	AIX	A/UX	HP-UX	IRIX	SCO OpenServer	Solaris	UnixWare	Linux	NeXTSTEP	OpenVMS	OSF/1	QNX	Tru64 UNIX
Bersirc	?	?	?	?	?	?	?	?	?	?	?	?	Yes	?	No	?	?	?
BitchX	?	Yes (Note: BitchX is known to work on BSDI 2.0, 2.1, 3.1, 4.0; FreeBSD 2.x, 3.x, 4.0; NetBSD 3.x, 4.x; SunOS 4.1.4; Ultrix; AIX; HP-UX 9.x, 10.x; IRIX 5.x, 6.x; Solaris 5.x and later; Linux; OSF/1 (DEC Alpha); QNX)	Yes	Yes	Yes	Yes	?	Yes	Yes	?	Yes	Yes	Yes	Yes	?	Yes	Yes	?
ChatZilla	No	No	Yes	Yes	No	Yes	No	Yes	Yes	Yes	Yes	Yes	Yes	No	Yes	No	Yes	Yes
Colloquy	No	No	No	No	No	No	No	No	No	No	No	No	No	No	No	No	No	No
ERC	Yes	Yes	Yes	Yes	Yes	Yes	Yes	Yes	Yes	Yes	Yes	Yes	Yes	Yes	Yes	Yes	Yes	Yes
HexChat	?	?	Yes	Yes	?	Yes	?	Yes	Yes	?	Yes	?	Yes	?	?	?	?	Yes
ircII	Yes	Yes	Yes	Yes	Yes	Yes	Yes	Yes	Yes	Yes	Yes	?	Yes	Yes	?	Yes	Yes	Yes
Ircle	No	No	No	No	No	No	No	No	No	No	No	No	No	No	No	No	No	No
Irssi	Yes	Yes	Yes	Yes	Yes	Yes	Yes	Yes	Yes	Yes	Yes	Yes	Yes	Yes	No	Yes	Yes	Yes
Konversation	?	?	Yes	?	?	?	?	?	?	?	Yes	?	Yes	?	?	?	?	Yes
KVIrc	?	?	Yes	?	?	?	?	?	?	?	Yes	?	Yes	?	?	?	?	?
LeafChat	No	No	No	No	No	No	No	No	No	No	No	No	Yes	No	No	No	No	No
Linkinus	No	No	No	No	No	No	No	No	No	No	No	No	No	No	No	No	No	No
Mibbit	?	?	Yes	Yes	Yes	Yes	?	Yes	Yes	Yes	Yes	Yes	Yes	?	Yes	?	?	Yes
mIRC	No	No	No	No	No	No	No	No	No	No	No	No	No	No	No	No	No	No
Nettalk	No	No	No	No	No	No	No	No	No	No	No	No	No	No	No	No	No	No
PIRCH	No	No	No	No	No	No	No	No	No	No	No	No	No	No	No	No	No	No
PJIRC	Yes	Yes	Yes	Yes	Yes	Yes	Yes	Yes	Yes	Yes	Yes	Yes	Yes	Yes	Yes	Yes	Yes	Yes
Quassel	?	?	Yes	?	?	?	?	?	?	?	Yes	?	Yes	?	?	?	?	?
rcirc	Yes	Yes	Yes	Yes	Yes	Yes	Yes	Yes	Yes	Yes	Yes	Yes	Yes	Yes	Yes	Yes	Yes	Yes
Smuxi	?	?	Yes	?	?	?	?	?	?	?	Yes	?	Yes	?	?	?	?	?
Snak	No	No	No	No	No	No	No	No	No	No	No	No	No	No	No	No	No	No
Visual IRC	No	No	No	No	No	No	No	No	No	No	No	No	No	No	No	No	No	No
WeeChat	?	?	Yes (Note: WeeChat tested on FreeBSD 4.11, 5.4, 6.0; NetBSD 2.0, 2.1; OpenBSD 3.6, 3.7, 3.8; Solaris 5.10; QNX 6.3)	?	?	?	?	Yes	Partial (Note: In development)	?	Yes	?	Yes	?	?	?	Yes	?
Client	386BSD	BSD/OS (BSD/386, BSDI)	FreeBSD, NetBSD, OpenBSD	SunOS	ULTRIX	AIX	A/UX	HP-UX	IRIX	SCO OpenServer	Solaris	UnixWare	Linux	NeXTSTEP	OpenVMS	OSF/1	QNX	Tru64 UNIX

== Protocol support ==
What IRC related protocols and standards are supported by each client.

Client	IPv6	SSL	TLS	DANE	OCSP	CRL	SASL	OTR	FISHLiM
Bersirc	No	No	?	?	?	?	?	No	?
BitchX	Yes	Yes	Yes	?	?	?	?	No	?
ChatZilla	Yes	Yes	Yes	?	Yes	Yes	script	No	?
Colloquy	Yes	Yes	?	?	?	?	Yes	No	?
ERC	Yes	Yes	Yes	?	?	?	Yes (Note: Supported via patch)	No	?
HexChat	Yes	Yes	Yes	No	No	No	Yes	Yes (Note: Supported via plugin)	Yes
ircII	Yes	Yes	Yes	?	?	?	?	No	?
Ircle	?	Yes	?	?	?	?	?	No	?
Irssi	Yes	Yes	Yes	Yes	No	?	Yes	Yes	Plug-In
Konversation	Yes	Yes	Yes	?	?	?	Yes	No	?
KVIrc	Yes	Yes	Yes	?	No	No	Yes	No	?
Linkinus	No	Yes	?	?	?	?	No	No	?
Mibbit	No	Yes	?	?	?	?	Yes	No	?
mIRC	Yes	Yes	Yes	?	?	?	Yes	No	Plug-In
Nettalk	No	No	?	?	?	?	?	No	?
PIRCH	No	No	?	?	?	?	?	No	?
PJIRC	No	No	?	?	?	?	?	No	?
Quassel	Yes	Yes	Yes	?	No	No	Yes	No	?
rcirc	No	Yes	Yes	?	?	?	?	No	?
Smuxi	Yes	Yes	?	?	?	?	No	No	?
Snak	Yes	Yes	?	?	?	?	?	No	?
Visual IRC	No	No	?	?	?	?	?	No	?
WeeChat	Yes	Yes	Yes	?	?	?	Yes	Yes	Yes
Client	IPv6	SSL	TLS	DANE	OCSP	CRL	SASL	OTR	FISHLiM

=== Direct Client-to-Client (DCC) support ===
The Direct Client-to-Client Protocol (DCC) has been the primary method of establishing connections directly between IRC clients for a long time now. Once established, DCC connections bypass the IRC network and servers, allowing for all sorts of data to be transferred between clients including files and direct chat sessions.

Client	CHAT	SEND	RESUME	TSEND	SEND T	XMIT	Passive DCC	Server	RDCC	REVERSE	RSEND	Reverse / Firewall DCC	File servers (FSERVs)	XDCC	VOICE	Whiteboard
Bersirc	?	?	?	?	?	?	No	No	?	?	?	?	?	?	?	?
BitchX	Yes	Yes	Yes	Yes	Yes	?	No	No	?	?	?	?	?	Yes	?	No
ChatZilla	Yes	Yes	No	?	?	No	No (Note: Planned for a later version)	No	No	No	No	No	No	?	?	No
Colloquy	Yes	Yes	Yes	?	?	?	Yes	No	?	?	?	?	?	Yes	?	?
ERC	Yes	Yes	?	?	?	?	?	?	?	?	?	?	?	?	?	?
HexChat	Yes	Yes	Yes	?	?	?	Yes	?	?	?	?	?	?	Yes	?	No
ircII	Yes	Yes	No	No	No	No	No	No	No	No	No	No	No	No	No	No
Ircle	?	?	?	?	?	?	?	?	?	?	?	?	?	?	?	?
Irssi	Yes	Yes	Yes	?	?	?	Yes	Yes	?	?	?	?	?	?	?	No
Konversation	Yes	Yes	Yes	?	?	?	Yes	No	?	?	?	Yes	?	Yes	?	Yes
KVIrc	Yes	Yes	Yes	Yes	No	No	Yes	No	No	Yes	Yes	Yes	Yes (Note: Supported via scripting)	Yes	Yes (Note: Incompatible with other IRC clients)	No
Linkinus	?	?	?	?	?	?	Yes	No	?	?	?	?	?	?	?	?
Mibbit	No	?	?	?	?	?	No	No	?	?	?	?	?	?	?	?
mIRC	Yes	Yes	Yes (Note: Supports the DCC Resume protocol)	?	?	?	Yes	Yes	Yes (Note: Supported via a script)	?	?	Yes	Yes	Yes	?	?
Nettalk	Yes	Yes	Yes	No	No	No	No	Partial	No	No	No	No	?	?	?	No
PIRCH	Yes	Yes	Yes	?	?	No	No	No	No	No	No	No	No	No	?	No
PJIRC	Yes	Yes	Yes	?	?	?	?	?	?	?	?	?	?	?	?	No
Quassel	No	No	No	No	No	No	No	No	No	No	No	No	No	No	?	No
rcirc	No	No	No	No	No	No	No	No	No	No	No	No	No	No	?	No
Smuxi	?	?	?	?	?	?	No	No	?	?	?	?	?	?	?	?
Snak	Yes	Yes	Yes	?	Yes	?	No	No	?	?	?	?	?	?	?	?
Visual IRC	?	?	Yes	?	?	?	Yes	No	?	?	?	Yes	?	?	Yes	Yes
WeeChat	Yes	Yes	?	?	?	?	No	No	?	?	?	?	?	Yes	?	?
Client	CHAT	SEND	RESUME	TSEND	SEND T	XMIT	Passive DCC	Server	RDCC	REVERSE	RSEND	Reverse / Firewall DCC	File servers (FSERVs)	XDCC	VOICE	Whiteboard

=== IRCv3 support ===
This software is compliant natively; other software may be compliant with extensions.

Clients	CAP	CAP 302	Cap-notify	Account-notify	account-tag	Away-notify	batch	Bot Mode	chghost	echo-message	extended-join	Invite-notify	labeled-response	message-tags	Monitor	msgid	multi-prefix	SASL v3.1	SASL v3.2	server-time	setname	sts	userhost-in-names	UTF8ONLY	WHOX	+typing	draft/ chathistory	WebIRC	draft/ account-registration	draft/ extended-monitor	draft/ multiline	+draft/ react	+draft/ reply
BitchX	Yes	No	No	No	No	No	No	No	No	No	No	No	No	No	No	No	No	Yes	No	No	No	No	No	No	No	No	No	?	?	?	?	?	?
Colloquy	Yes	Yes	Yes	Yes	Yes	Yes	Yes	No	Yes	Yes	Yes	Yes	No	No	Yes	No	Yes	Yes	No	Yes	No	No	Yes	No	Yes	No	No	?	?	No	No	No	No
HexChat	Yes	Yes	Yes	Yes	2.16	Yes	No	No	Yes	No	Yes	2.16	No	No	Yes	No	Yes	Yes	Yes	Yes	2.16	No	Yes	2.16	Yes	No	No	?	?	?	?	?	?
Irssi	Yes	Yes	Yes	Yes	No	Yes	No	No	Yes	No	Yes	Yes	No	Yes	No	No	Yes	Yes	No	No	Yes	No	No	No	Yes	No	No	?	?	?	?	?	?
KVIrc	Yes	No	No	Yes	No	Yes	No	No	Yes	No	Yes	No	No	No	No	No	Yes	Yes	No	Yes	No	No	Yes	No	No	No	No	?	?	?	?	?	?
Konversation	Yes	Yes	Yes	Yes	No	Yes	No	No	Yes	No	Yes	No	No	No	No	No	Yes	Yes	Yes	Yes	No	No	Yes	No	Yes	No	No	?	?	?	?	?	?
Mibbit	Yes	No	No	No	No	No	No	No	No	No	No	No	No	No	No	No	No	Yes	No	No	No	No	No	?	No	No	?	No	No	No	No	No	No
Mozilla Thunderbird	Yes	72.0+	72.0+	No	No	No	No	No	No	73.0+	No	No	No	No	Yes	No	Yes	Yes	72.0+	60.0+	No	No	No	No	No	No	No	?	?	?	?	?	?
Quassel IRC	Yes	Yes	Yes	Yes	0.14+	Yes	No	No	Yes	0.14+ (opt in)	Yes	0.14+	No	0.14+	No	No	Yes	Yes	Yes	0.14+	0.14+	No	Yes	No	Yes	No	No	?	?	?	?	?	?
WeeChat	Yes	2.2+	Yes	Yes	No	Yes	No	No	2.2+	No	Yes	2.2+	No	3.3+	Yes	No	Yes	Yes	3.3+	Yes	3.3+	No	Yes	No	Yes	3.3+	No	?	?	?	?	?	?
mIRC	Yes	Yes	Yes	Yes	Yes	Yes	Yes	No	Yes	No	Yes	Yes	7.62+	Yes	Yes	Yes	Yes	Yes	Yes	Yes	7.62+	Yes	Yes	No	Yes	No	No	?	?	?	?	?	?

==== IRCv3 SASL mechanisms ====
IRC SASL authentication primarily uses the same mechanisms as SASL in other protocols. Most commonly:

- PLAIN as defined by RFC 4616
- EXTERNAL as defined by RFC 4422
- SCRAM-SHA-256 as defined by RFC 7677

Client	EXTERNAL	PLAIN	SCRAM-SHA-256
BitchX	No	Yes	No
Colloquy	No	Yes	No
HexChat	Yes	Yes	No
Irssi	Yes	Yes	No
KVIrc	Yes	Yes	No
Konversation	Yes	Yes	No
Mozilla Thunderbird	No	Yes	No
WeeChat	Yes	Yes	3.2+
catgirl	Yes	Yes	No
mIRC	Yes	Yes	7.68+
pydle(lib.)	No	Yes	No
senpai	No	Yes	No
zIRC(lib.)	Yes	Yes	No

== Features ==
Information on what features each of the clients support.

Client	Multi-server	UTF-8	Proxy server	irc:// URI scheme	Automatic updates	Scripting language
Bersirc	Yes	No	?	?	?	—N/a
BitchX	Yes	No	?	?	?	Enhanced IrcII script
ChatZilla	Yes	Yes	Yes	Yes	Yes	JavaScript
Colloquy	Yes	Yes	?	Yes	Yes (Note: Automatically updates via the Sparkle framework)	AppleScript, Cocoa, F-Script, JavaScript, Python
ERC	Yes	Yes	Yes (Note: Can be added with separate packages.)	Yes	Yes (Note: Supports automatic updates via the Emacs package manager)	Emacs Lisp
HexChat	Yes	Yes	Yes	Yes	Yes	Perl, Python, Tcl, Lua (Note: Since 2.9.5 HexChat is shipped only with Perl and Python.), JavaScript, C, C++, and via D-Bus.
ircII	Yes	Yes (Note: Supported as of version 20050921)	?	?	?	IrcII script
Ircle	Yes	No	?	?	?	AppleScript
Irssi	Yes	Yes	Yes	No	No	Perl
Konversation	Yes	Yes	Yes	Yes	?	Shell script, Ruby, Python, Perl, Java, C++, C#, JavaScript (Note: Any language which supports DCOP may be used for Konversation scripting. Virtually any language can be made to support Konversation scripting by executing the command line "dcop" program.)
KVIrc	Yes	Yes	Yes	Yes	No	KVS (custom), Perl, Python, C++
LeafChat	Yes	Yes	?	—N/a	Yes	Java
Linkinus	Yes	Yes	Yes	Yes	Yes	AppleScript, Cocoa
Mibbit	Yes	Yes	?	Yes	—N/a	—N/a
mIRC	Yes	Yes	Yes	Yes	Yes (Note: Only looks for updates, they need to be manually downloaded and installed.)	mIRC script
Nettalk	Yes	Yes	SOCKS	Yes	Yes	VBScript, custom
PIRCH	Yes	No	?	?	No	Yes
PJIRC	Yes	Yes	?	?	No	Partial, JavaScript
Quassel	Yes	Yes	Yes	?	No	No
rcirc	Yes	Yes	?	?	No	Emacs Lisp
Smuxi	Yes	Yes	Yes	?	?	Yes (language agnostic)
Snak	Yes	Yes	?	?	?	AppleScript, IrcII script
Visual IRC	Yes	No	?	?	?	Versus
WeeChat	Yes	Yes	Yes	Yes	?	C, Perl, Python, Ruby, Lua, Tcl, Scheme (Guile)
Client	Multi-server	UTF-8	Proxy server	irc:// URI scheme	Automatic updates	Scripting language

== See also ==
- Comparison of cross-platform instant messaging clients
  - Comparison of user features of messaging platforms
  - Comparison of instant messaging protocols
- Comparison of VoIP software
  - List of SIP software
- Comparison of LAN messengers
