= Pirch =

Pirch or PIRCH may refer to:

== People ==
- Georg Dubislav Ludwig von Pirch - Prussian general during Napoleonic Wars
- Otto Karl Lorenz von Pirch - Prussian general during Napoleonic Wars

== Other ==
- PIRCH (company) - retail company
- PIRCH (IRC client) - shareware Internet Relay Chat (IRC) client
