= KVIrc =

IRC Client

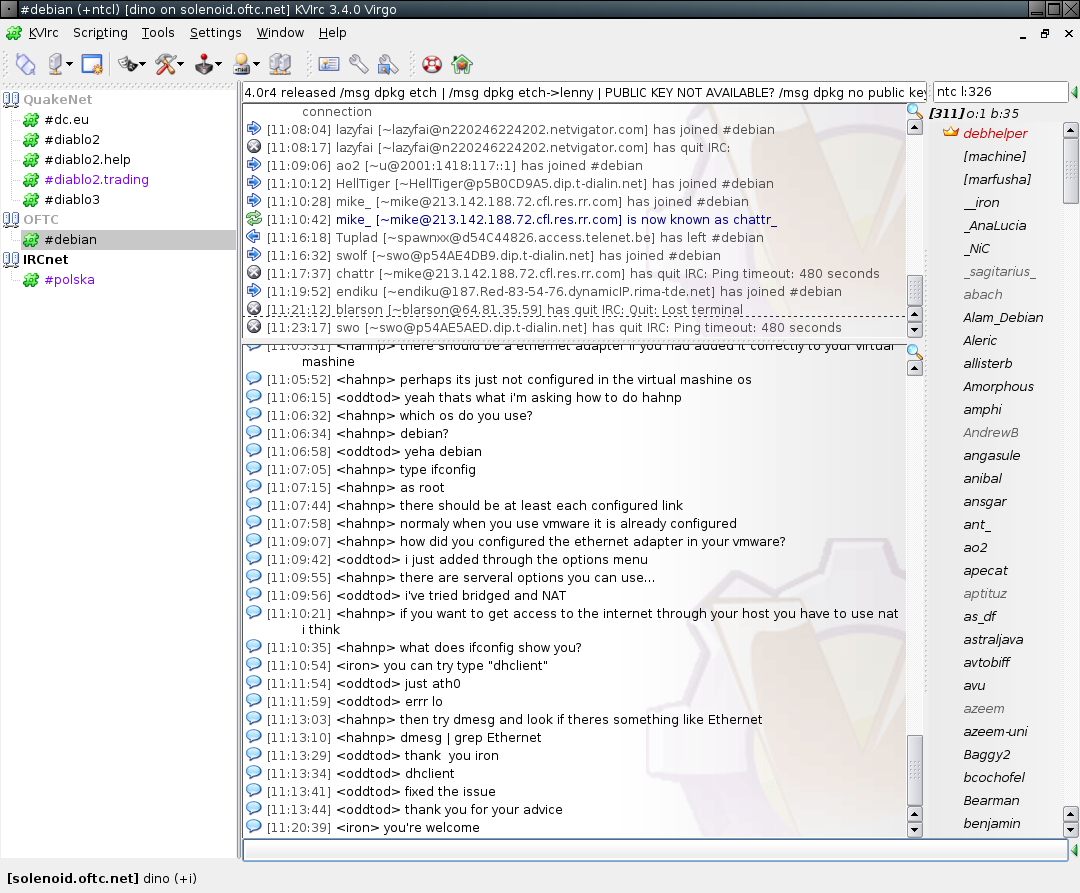
- A screenshot of KVIrc
- Original author: Szymon Stefanek (Pragma)
- Developer: The KVIrc Development Team
- Stable release: 5.2.8 "Quasar" / July 30, 2025; 14 months ago
- Preview release: 5.2.8-dev / November 10, 2025; 10 months ago
- Written in: C++
- Operating system: Mac OS X, Unix-like, Windows
- Platform: Cross-platform
- Available in: Multilingual
- Type: IRC client
- License: GPL-2.0-or-later (Note: GPL-2.0-or-later with OpenSSL exception.)
- Website: www.kvirc.net
- Repository: github.com/kvirc/KVIrc

KVIrc is a graphical IRC client for Linux, Unix, Mac OS and Windows. The name is an acronym of K Visual IRC in which the K stands for a dependency to KDE, which became optional from version 2.0.0. The software is based on the Qt framework and its code is released under a modified GNU General Public License.

== Features ==
KVIrc is able to connect to several servers at the same time (optionally with SSL and/or over IPv6). Unicode, ISO-8859-*, Asian and Windows-native character sets are supported. DCC is supported. A special feature is the smart encoding, which allows the user to use 2 encodings at the same time; the user can send Unicode and read Unicode and CP-1252 for example.

Along with the widely supported mIRC-Codes for bold, underlined and colored fonts, KVIrc provides graphical emoticons and animated avatars. The chat interface is highly configurable and supports downloadable themes.

The channel windows can be split in two subwindows, one for chat messages and the other for commands like joins/parts/mode changes. The size of the subwindows is variable, so the user is able to hide the commands window. Every channel, query and DCC Chat is encryptable with Blowfish or AES/Rijndael.

KVIrc has its own scripting language named KVS which can be used to add complex functions to react automatically to network events. Perl and Python can be also used to a certain degree. Object-oriented programming is supported and the builtin Qt binding classes allow building additional parts of user interface. The SocketSpy feature allows developers to watch the raw communication between client and server.

== Development ==
Szymon Stefanek began the development of KVIrc in 1998 and released the first public version in 1999. The software had a strict dependency on the KDE libraries and was available only on the Linux operating system. The interest of the free software community grew quickly, the client was included in several Linux distributions, and additional developers joined the project, forming the informal KVIrc Development Team.

Since the KDE libraries were still in an early development stage, their interface was changing very frequently and it became hard for the developers to follow them. Moreover, there was strong interest in porting KVIrc to Windows, where KDE wasn't available. As a response, the strict dependency on KDELibs was gradually weakened and, in version 2.0.0, officially dropped. Partial KDE integration is still available as a compile-time option.

KVIrc 3.0.0 was released in 2004 with the support for Linux and Windows platforms. A preliminary Mac OS port followed in the same year.

As of July 2025, the latest stable release is 5.2.8 Quasar.

== Distribution ==
KVIrc is included in these Linux distributions: Ubuntu, Debian, Gentoo Linux, Arch Linux, OpenSUSE, Mageia and Red Hat Enterprise Linux/Fedora. Other Linux systems are supported via community-contributed binary packages and build scripts. KVIrc is also available for Microsoft Windows 2000 / XP / Vista / 7, Mac OS X and FreeBSD.

== See also ==
- Comparison of Internet Relay Chat clients
