= XiRCON =

Internet Relay Chat (IRC) client

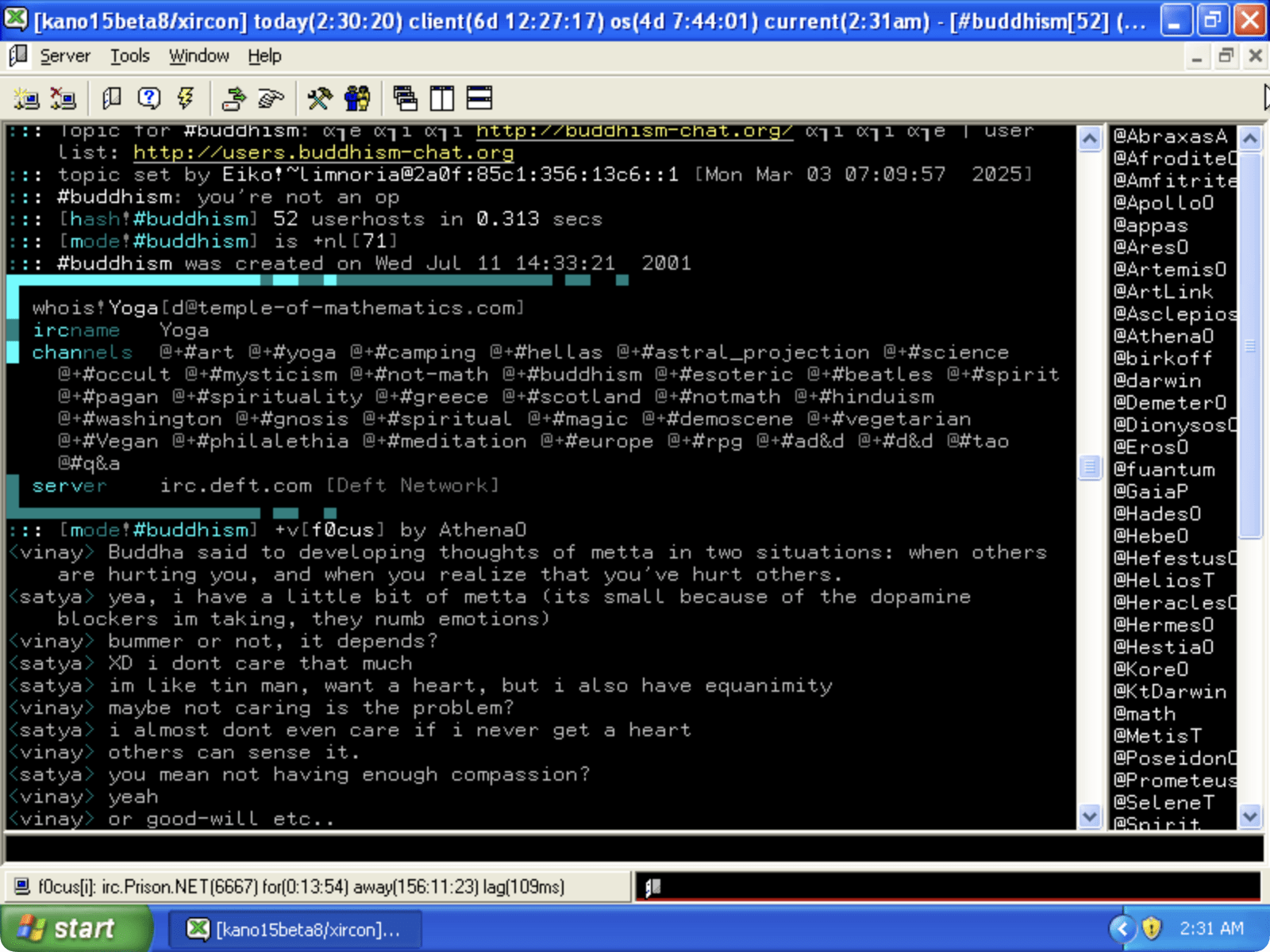
- XiRCON 1.0B4 running Kano 15b8 w/ conio theme loaded on Windows XP.
- Original author: Mark Hanson
- Initial release: 1996
- Final release: 1.0B4 (August 10, 1997; 28 years ago) [±]
- Written in: Borland C++/Object Windows Library, scripted with Tcl
- Operating system: Microsoft Windows
- Platform: x86
- Available in: English
- Type: IRC client
- License: Freeware

XiRCON is a discontinued freeware IRC client for Microsoft Windows. After TCP/IP was added to Windows, XiRCON was one of the most popular IRC clients on the platform. The XiRCON client was used for a number of fields, such as library helpdesk, genealogy, and US Naval command. Author Mark Hanson ceased development in 1997.

== Adoption ==
Due to its graphical user interface and ease of use, XiRCON is a suggested client in Learn Internet Relay Chat, Volume 1 (Toyer, 1998). The client received a four-star rating "(better than most, very solid)" from IRCReviews.com, which summarized, "An IRC client that appeals to users of all skill levels." With the proliferation of mIRC computer worms, Steal this Computer Book 4.0 recommended switching to competing IRC clients like XiRCON.

=== U.S. Navy ===
XiRCON was approved for military use, and in the US Navy it was more popular than mIRC. In an effort to evaluate how real-time communications boost productivity in US Military command, a 2004 paper by Pacific Science & Engineering Group estimated that 28-50% of command groups used XiRCON.

== Post-discontinuation ==
After its discontinuation, XiRCON fielded a steadily growing community based around the Kano script, among others. As mIRC progressed it started to include XiRCON features such as multi-server support and visual themes. XiRCON's remaining userbase began to dwindle as mIRC became more stable and popular scripts comparable to Kano were released. A very small community still keeps the program alive via moderating the official IRC channel, #XiRCON on EFnet.

An attempt was made to clone XiRCON by David Gravereaux, who was also the author of the Falcon extension for XiRCON, but has yet to complete it. Gravereaux also wrote a "hack" for XiRCON that allowed it to use any Tcl core v8.1 or higher.
