= Nettalk =

Nettalk may refer to:

- NETtalk (artificial neural network)
- Nettalk (IRC client)
