= IRC Cloud =

- Original authors: Richard Jones; James Wheare
- Developer: IRCCloud Ltd.
- Written in: Erlang; JavaScript
- Operating system: Web browser Android iOS
- Available in: English
- License: Freemium
- Website: www.irccloud.com

IRC Cloud is a cloud-based IRC client that is used via web browser, Android and iOS. IRC Cloud was founded by Richard Jones and James Wheare.

== See also ==
- Comparison of IRC clients
