= Quassel IRC =

Cross-platform IRC client

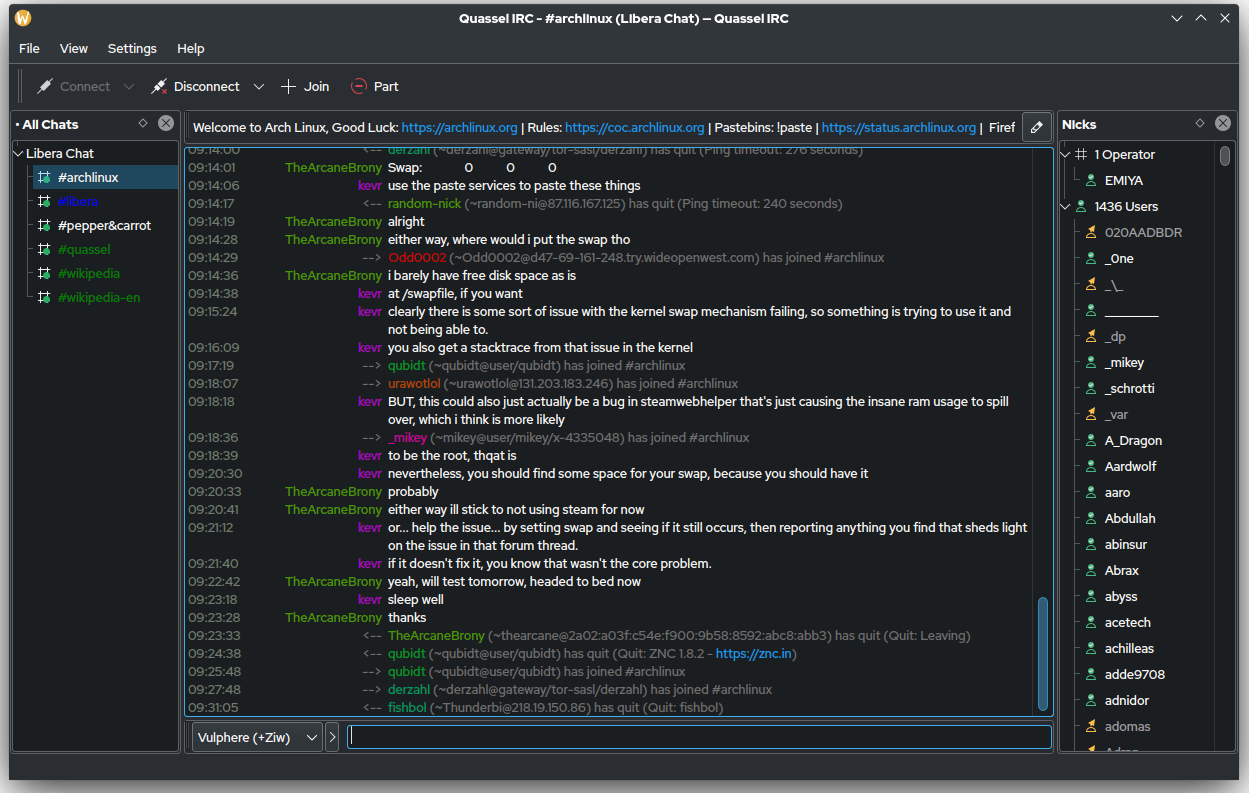
- Screenshot of Quassel IRC on Arch Linux with KDE Plasma 5, 2022.
- Developer: Quassel IRC Team
- Initial release: 0.3.0 August 27, 2008
- Stable release: 0.14.0 / 1 January 2022
- Repository: github.com/quassel/quassel
- Written in: C++
- Operating system: macOS, Unix-like, Windows
- Platform: Cross-platform
- Type: IRC client
- License: GPL-2.0-only or GPL-3.0-only
- Website: quassel-irc.org

Quassel IRC, or simply Quassel, is a graphical, distributed, cross-platform IRC client, introduced in 2008. It is released under the GNU General Public License version 2 and version 3, for GNU and Unix-like operating systems, macOS, and Microsoft Windows. It has also been ported to OS/2 Warp due to its cross-platform nature. Since the release of Kubuntu 9.04 (Jaunty Jackalope) Quassel is Kubuntu's default IRC client. Quassel uses the Qt application framework.

Quassel's key feature is in storing chat history on a user's server and providing it to the user, including chat history of when the user's computer was offline.

== Structure ==
Quassel is based on a client–server model. The core application uses a LAN or the Internet to connect to one or more clients, and also various IRC servers. The client does not communicate with the IRC server directly; it does so through the core. This way, the connection to the IRC network is maintained by the core, even though no clients are using it. A monolith version of the application is also supported; which acts like a normal IRC client, with no separation between core and client. Android (Quasseldroid) and iOS (iQuassel) clients are also available.

This system is similar to what Irssi, WeeChat with GNU Screen, and Smuxi use.

== Features ==
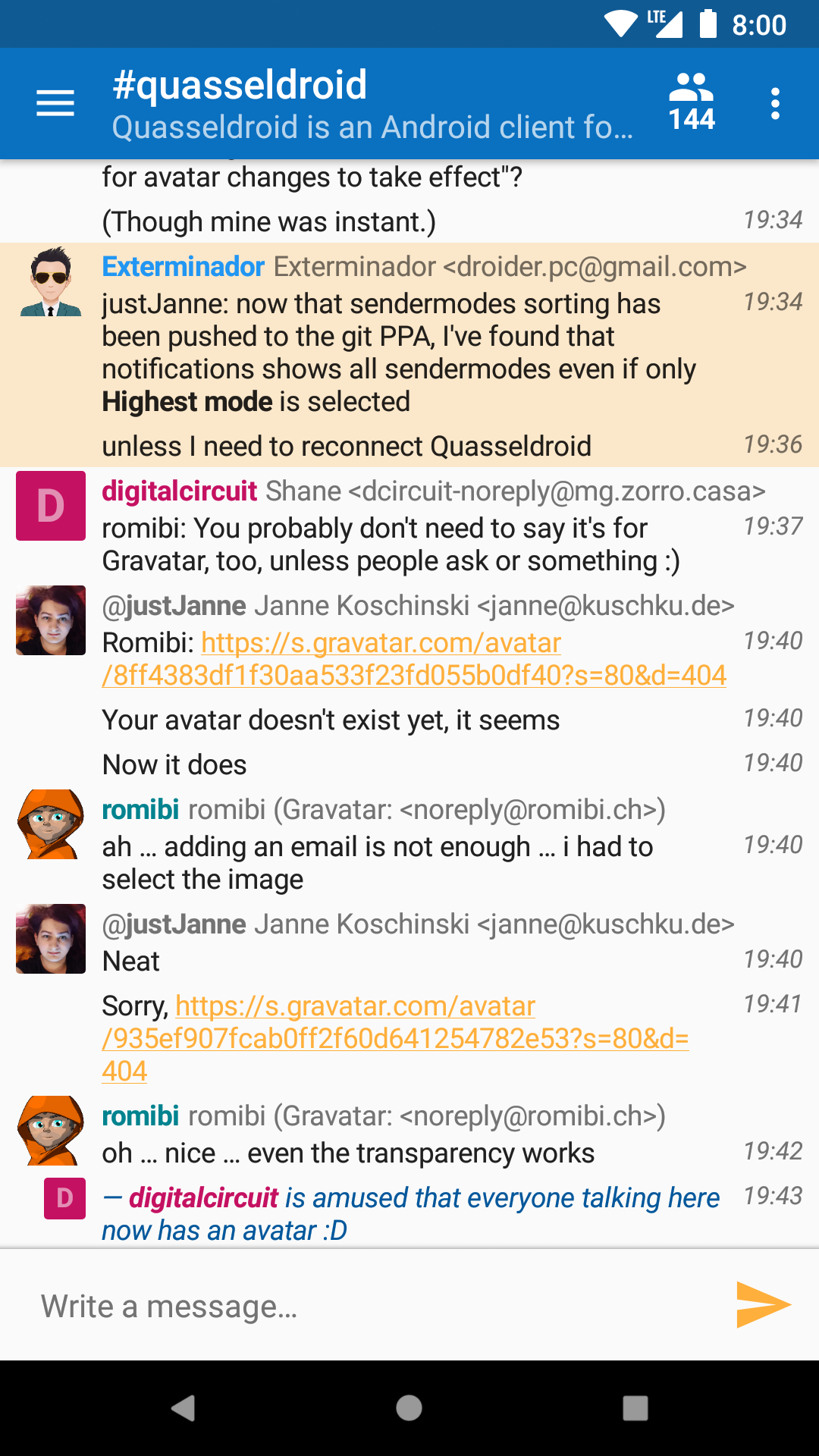
The Quasseldroid Android app, which can connect to a Quassel core

Quassel allows simultaneous connections to multiple IRC servers. Different identities can be created, and used on one or more of the servers the core connects to. These identities each contain default nicknames, fallback nicknames, away messages and so on. Each identity can be assigned to one or more servers.

Quassel stores discussion history in either a PostgreSQL or a SQLite database. When scrolling up through the chat window, older sections of chat are loaded automatically from stored logs. In this way, one can seamlessly view logs of past discussions.

Aliases, command shortcuts, are also available; with these, a user can create an alias for a long command with many parameters. The connection between the client and the core can be encrypted using Secure Sockets Layer (SSL), and proxies are supported.

In a 2009 roundup of large IRC clients for Tom's Hardware, Adam Overa described Quassel as being "fully featured" with "tons of options", and said "even new users should have no problem connecting to servers and finding channels using the GUI tools for server presets and channel lists."

== See also ==
- Comparison of Internet Relay Chat clients
