= Smuxi =

IRC client

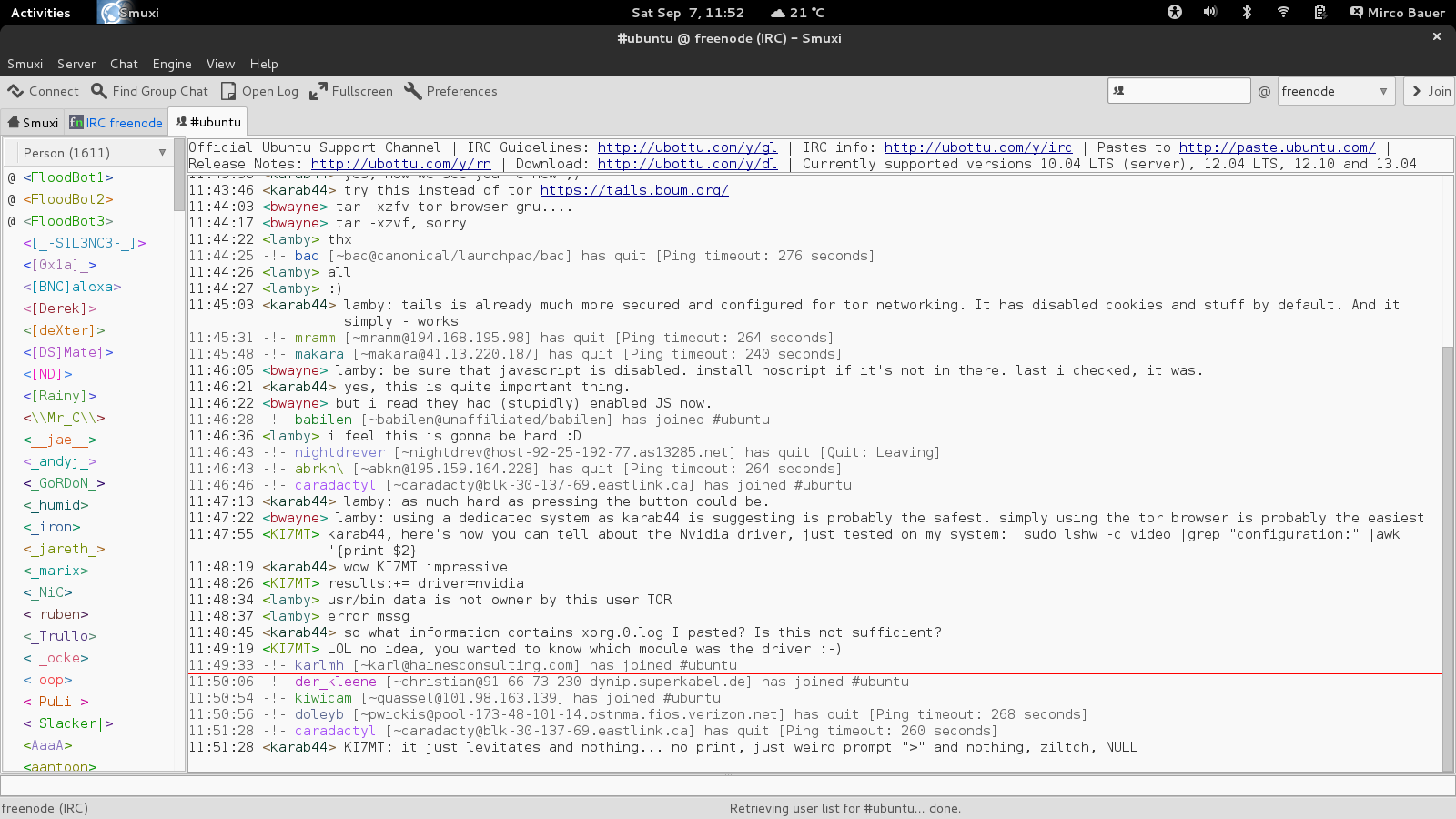
- Smuxi 0.9 on GNOME3
- Developer(s): Mirco Bauer
- Initial release: July 19, 2008
- Stable release: 1.2.1 (April 23, 2023; 23 months ago) [±]
- Repository: github.com/meebey/smuxi
- Written in: C#
- Operating system: FreeBSD, Linux, OS X, Windows
- Available in: 17 languages
- List of languages British English, Chinese Simplified, Czech, Catalan, Danish, English, Finnish, French, German, Italian, Portuguese, Russian (partial), Slovak, Spanish, Swedish, Turkish (partial), Urdu (partial)
- Type: IRC client
- License: GPL-2.0-or-later
- Website: www.smuxi.org

Smuxi is a cross-platform IRC client for the GNOME desktop inspired by Irssi. It pioneered the concept of separating the frontend client from the backend engine which manages connections to IRC servers inside a single graphical application.

== Architecture ==
Smuxi is based on the client–server model: The core application exists in the Smuxi back-end server which is connected to the Internet around-the-clock. The user interacts with one or more Smuxi front-end clients which are connected to the Smuxi back-end server. This way, the Smuxi back-end server can maintain connections to IRC servers even when all Smuxi front-end clients have been closed.

The combination of screen and Irssi served as an example of this architecture. The Quassel IRC client has a similar design.

Smuxi also supports the regular single application mode. This behaves like a typical IRC client with no separation of back-end and front-end. It utilizes a local IRC engine that is used by the local front-end client.

== Features ==
Smuxi supports nick colors which are identical across channels and networks, a Caret Mode as seen in Firefox that allows users to navigate through the messages using the keyboard, theming with colors and fonts, configurable tray-icon support, optional stripping of colours and formattings and convenience features like CTCP support, channel search and nickname completion. It has a tabbed document interface, tabbed user interface, and support for multiple servers. Smuxi can attach to a local backend engine or a remote engine utilizing the Engine drop down menu (similar to screen used with irssi). It also includes, in client-server operation, a visual marker showing the user's last activity in an open session, and ignore filtering.

== Distribution ==
Smuxi can be found in many major operating systems such as: Debian GNU/Linux (including Debian GNU/kFreeBSD), Ubuntu, Arch Linux, openSUSE Community Repository, Frugalware Linux, Slackware, and FreeBSD.

Smuxi is also available for Microsoft Windows XP, Vista, 7, 8.x and 10 (32-bit and 64-bit architectures).

Smuxi is available for Mac OS X starting with the 0.8.9 release.

== Reception ==
Smuxi was selected in "Hot Picks" by Linux Format Magazine in March 2009. TuxRadar wrote:

If you're looking for IRC clients you're spoilt for choice with many distributions, as there are plenty to choose from. Some are text-based (IRSSI), some integrate well with instant messenger applications (Pidgin) while others are simply IRC clients through and through. Smuxi falls into the latter category, and we're glad it does, because it's a good little IRC client.

In Tom's Hardware, Adam Overa wrote:

smuxi is a lightweight client with a slim, yet fully customizable interface. [...] smuxi allows the user to completely change the default interface, moving or removing just about any aspect.

In LinuxToday, Joe Brockmeier wrote:

If you spend much time with any open source project, you're probably going to be spending time in IRC. If you want to make sure you don't miss a minute of your project's conversations, you'll want to check out Smuxi.

== See also ==
- Comparison of IRC clients
