= Rcirc =

IRC client

rcirc
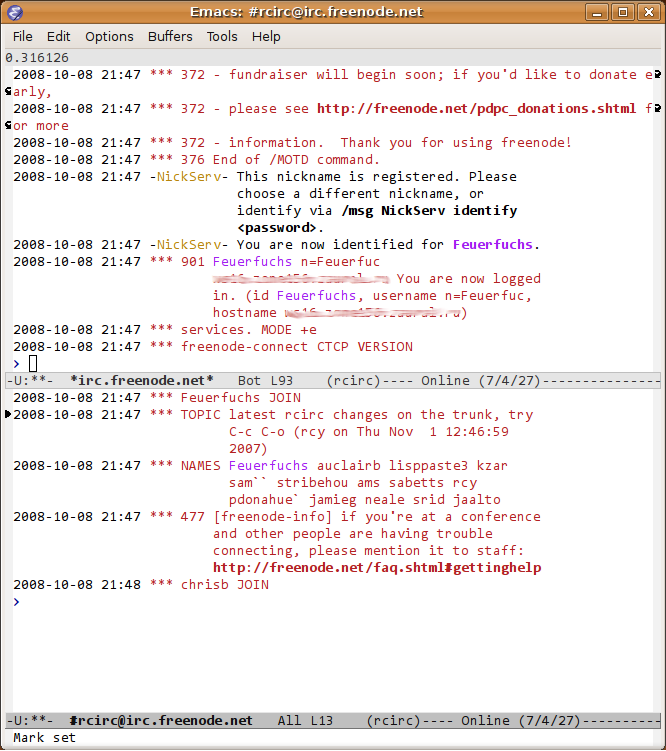
- rcirc in GNU Emacs 23
- Original author(s): Ryan Yeske
- Stable release: rcirc improvements are now released as part of Emacs. [±]
- Written in: Emacs Lisp
- Size: 149 KB
- Type: IRC client
- License: GPL-3.0-or-later
- Website: gnu.org/software/emacs/

rcirc is an Internet Relay Chat (IRC) client written in Emacs Lisp. It is one of two IRC clients included in GNU Emacs since release 22.1, alongside ERC.

Rcirc is "compact, written in a single file of around 4,000 lines of code". It allocates separate buffers for each server and channel, and includes tab completion and inbound message timestamps. It allows opening new buffers for composing messages, useful for multiline work. All IRC commands are bound to control-c command shortcuts. Sound alerts are available for private messages and for when a user's nick is mentioned in channel.

== See also ==
- Comparison of IRC clients
