= PIRCH (IRC client) =

Shareware IRC client

- PIRCH98 running in Windows XP.
- Developer(s): Northwest Computer Services
- Final release: 1.0.1.1190 (January 1, 2001; 24 years ago) [±]
- Operating system: Windows
- Type: IRC client
- License: Shareware
- Website: pirchat.com at the Library of Congress Web Archives (archived September 14, 2002)

PIRCH or pIRCh is a shareware Internet Relay Chat (IRC) client published by Northwest Computer Services. Its name is an acronym – PolarGeek's IRC Hack.

The last version of the program, known as PIRCH98, was released in 1998. PIRCH has in the past been considered to be the number-two Windows IRC client behind mIRC.

PIRCH inspired the creation of Vortec IRC due to a lack of software updates.

== Reception ==
Forrest Stroud's 1998 review of Pirch stated it has "great selection of features and is an IRC client that will especially appeal to novice IRC users", such as the capability of simultaneous multiple server connections. But Stroud noted, "PIRCH is relatively slow in listing channels for servers and also lacks the capability to filter the number of channels based on the number of users or the ability to sort based on the name of a channel".

In 1999, Joe Barr of LinuxWorld referred to Pirch as a "nice Windows client".

== See also ==
- Comparison of Internet Relay Chat clients
