= Konversation =

IRC client

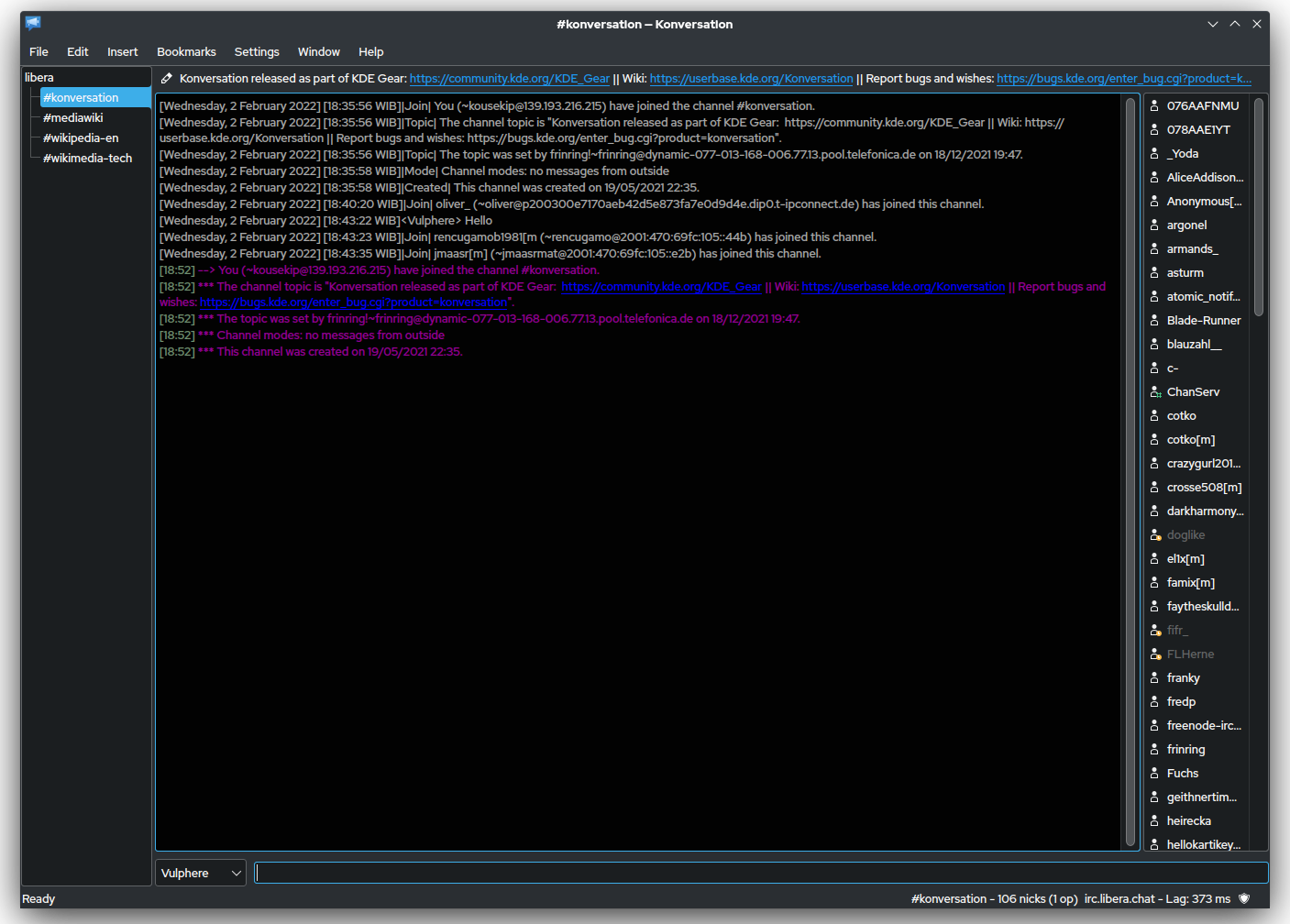
- Konversation connected to an IRC network
- Developer: KDE
- Stable release: 1.10.24083 / 7 November 2024; 14 months ago
- Repository: invent.kde.org/network/konversation
- Written in: C++ (Qt)
- Platform: Microsoft Windows, Linux
- Type: IRC client
- License: GPL-2.0-or-later
- Website: konversation.kde.org

Konversation is an Internet Relay Chat (IRC) client built on the KDE Platform and is free software released under the terms of the GNU GPL-2.0-or-later. Konversation is currently maintained in the KDE Extragear Network module, which means that it has its own release cycle which is independent from the main KDE applications. It is the default IRC client in many prominent Linux distributions, such as openSUSE, the KDE spin of Fedora, and Kubuntu.

== Features ==
Konversation supports IPv6 connections, offers SSL server support, and supports Blowfish encryption. It also supports identity management with multiple server connections using separate identities for different servers and can display multiple servers and channels in one window. Konversation features automatic UTF-8 detection and can support different encodings in different channels. It also features an optional on-screen display (OSD) for message notifications and can save bookmarks for channels and servers. Konversation supports colors, text decorations, and themable nicklist icons. Konversation is also scriptable using shell scripts via D-BUS and includes support for aliases and an action system for automatic events. It also identifies different users in the conversation window by choosing a random color for each user.

== See also ==
- Comparison of Internet Relay Chat clients
