= LeafChat =

IRC client

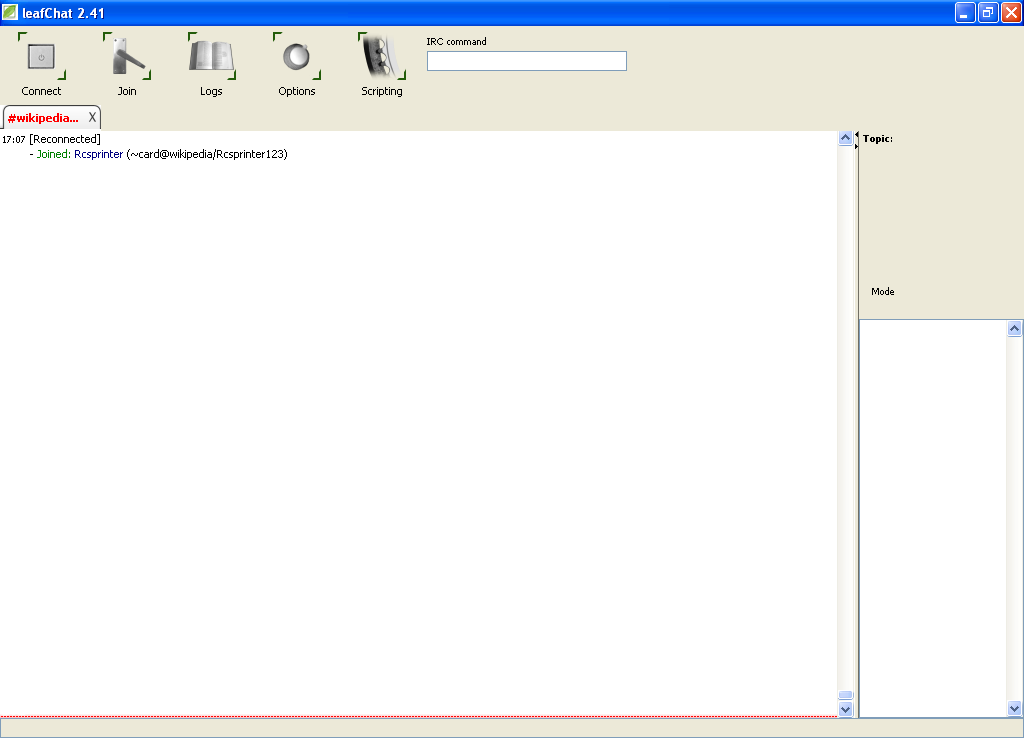
- LeafChat 2.41 connected to an IRC network
- Original author: Samuel Marshall
- Developer: leafdigital
- Stable release: 2.5 / July 29, 2012; 13 years ago
- Written in: Java
- Operating system: Microsoft Windows, OS X, Linux
- Platform: Cross-platform
- Size: 5.5 MB
- Available in: English; Japanese
- Type: IRC client
- License: GPL-3.0-or-later
- Website: leafdigital.com (English) leafdigital.com (Japanese)

LeafChat is a free IRC client for Microsoft Windows and Unix-like operating systems, licensed under the GNU GPL-3.0-or-later.

== Features ==
Each channel is inside a tab which can be easily selected between while chatting. Most networks' servers are supported for connection; multiple networks can be connected to simultaneously. Users can add their own scripts and command shortcuts, and the software detects net splits.

== Reception ==
TUCOWS circa 2004 showed LeafChat with a popularity of about 1/4, but a rating of four (of five) stars. Beginning in 2004, IRCReviews gave the software five stars (of five), as an Editors's Choice, describing it as "powerful, good looking, and scriptable." In a 2010 review of version 2, LeafChat was described as "very well done", with a "killer" scripting API which was "convenient and easy", though the reviewer found some user-interface defaults "annoying", and ruled out using LeafChat due to perceived variable count limitations. In a 2011 summary of four popular IRC clients, Techbuzz India described LeafChat as "one of the best" open-source clients with a "clean and simple" interface, and noted its ability to connect to multiple servers simultaneously. The Simple Genetic Algorithm project at SourceForge suggested LeafChat (due to its zero cost) for its online IRC live developer support, and thoroughly outlined its setup.

== See also ==
- Comparison of Internet Relay Chat clients
