= ChatZilla =

IRC client

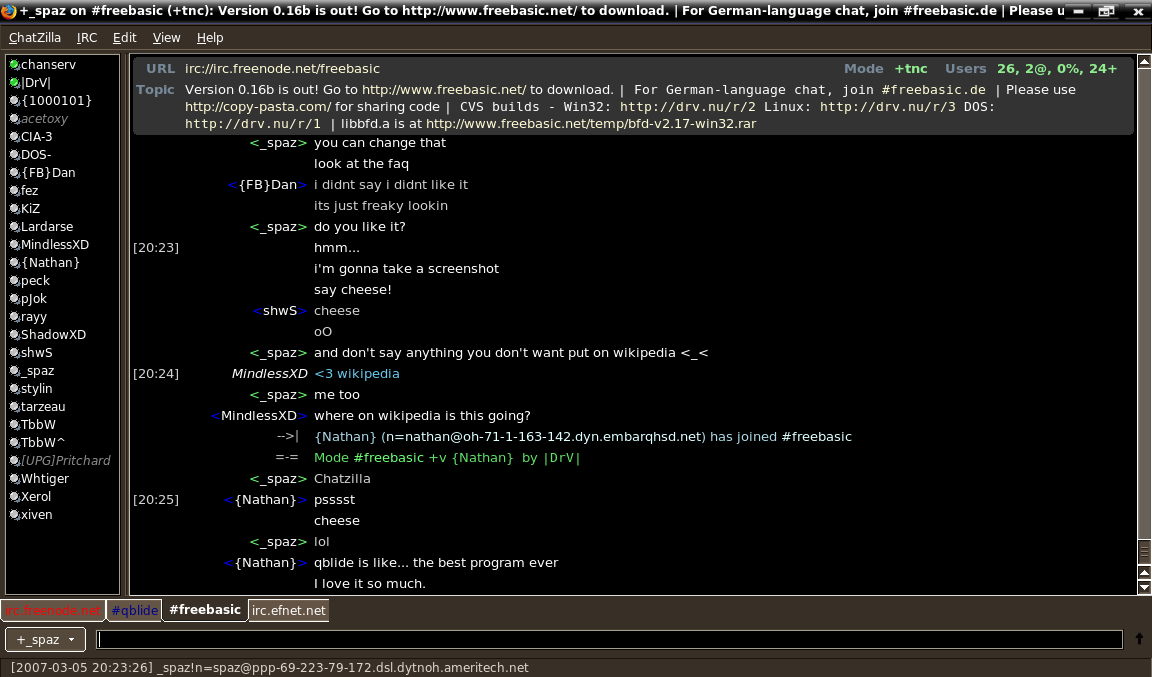
- ChatZilla with Midnight theme and black motif
- Developers: James Ross, Robert Ginda, Samuel Sieb, Gijs Kruitbosch
- Final release: 0.9.93 (November 8, 2016; 9 years ago) [±]
- Written in: JavaScript, XUL
- Platform: Mozilla Firefox
- Available in: 9 languages
- List of languages Catalan, English, French, German, Italian, Polish, Portuguese, Russian and Spanish.
- Type: IRC client
- License: MPL-2.0
- Website: chatzilla.hacksrus.com
- Repository: hg.mozilla.org/chatzilla

ChatZilla is an IRC client that is part of SeaMonkey. It was previously an extension for Mozilla-based browsers such as Firefox, introduced in 2000. It is cross-platform open source software which has been noted for its consistent appearance across platforms, CSS appearance customization and scripting.

== Early history ==
On April 20, 1999, it was reported that Mozilla, at the time the open-source arm of AOL's Netscape Communications division, had announced the commencement of "an instant messaging and chat project with the stated goal of supporting a wide variety of chat protocols, including "the venerable Internet Relay Chat". Other companies were also developing chat systems. "'We recognize that there's a lot of interest in the instant messaging space,' said AOL spokesperson Catherine Corre, referring to the Mozilla project. 'This is a recognition of the interest in that area.'" At the time, the new chat client proposal was reported as being "competition" to AOL's own AOL Instant Messenger chat client, and on April 21, 1999, the announcement was rescinded "pending further review by Netscape." Independently, programmer Robert Ginda developed an IRC client and submitted it to the Mozilla project, which as of September 1999 planned to introduce it with the planned release of Mozilla browser. Named "ChatZilla", the client was available in development form in May 2000 for the Netscape 6.01 browser, and Mozilla 0.8.

== Features ==
ChatZilla runs on any platform on which SeaMonkey can run, including OS X, Linux, and Microsoft Windows, and provides a "consistent user interface across the board." It can also be used as a standalone app using XULRunner.

It contains most general features of IRC clients, including connecting to multiple servers at once, maintaining a built-in list of standard networks, searching and sorting of available channels, chat logging, Direct Client-to-Client ("DCC") chat and file transfers, and user customization of the interface. ChatZilla includes automatic completion of nicknames with the Tab key, and appends a comma if the nickname is the first word on a line. It also provides completion of /commands with the Tab key, and a "quick double-Tab" presents a list of available commands based on what's been typed so far. The text entry window can be "single line", in which the Enter key sends the composed text, or "multiline" in which allows composing larger text sections with line breaks, and the Ctrl-Enter key combo sends the text block. JavaScript is used for running scripts and messages are styled with CSS, which can be controlled by the user: by selecting from the View menu, dragging a link to a .css file to the message window, or with the /motif command. DCC is supported which allows users to transfer files and chat directly between one another. The sender of each message is shown to the left of the text as a link—clicking the link opens a private chat window to that user.

ChatZilla is included with SeaMonkey and was available for download to other Mozilla-based browsers such as Firefox as an extension. It could also be run in a tab in Firefox.

== Plugins ==
ChatZilla offers many plugins, which extend the functionality in the user-experience of the add-on.

Some of these plugins include:

- TinyURL – replaces long URLs (typically those with more than 80 characters) with TinyURL links
- googleapi – searches Google and displays the top result
- cZiRATE – shares the song the user is currently listening to on iRATE Radio

== Incompatibility with newer Firefox ==
Firefox Quantum (version 57) dropped support for add-ons built using XUL and XPCOM, including ChatZilla. Upon Mozilla publishing the roadmap for Firefox's support of WebExtensions, one developer commented that converting ChatZilla would require redesigning the UI and separating out the network code, which needs special privileges. Another developer did some experimental work towards these ends, but nobody continued the effort. Developers instead worked on a fork called Ambassador, which updates the XUL-based ChatZilla code to remain compatible with pre-Quantum forks of Firefox. In April 2025 a Mozilla employee closed the ChatZilla porting task as incomplete, ending the project for all intents and purposes.

== Reception ==
Reviews of ChatZilla have varied from enthusiastic, in the case of users familiar with IRC, to unimpressed, for reviewers more accustomed to other chat client user interfaces. A 2003 review in Computers for Doctors of Mozilla 1.0, referred to IRC client applications as "not very user-friendly, and the same goes for ChatZilla. You won't find any pop-up icons, or happy little noises telling you somebody wants to chat." In 2004, Jennifer Golbeck, writing in IRC Hacks, pointed out its cross-platform consistency, and found it "quick and easy to start using", and has "great support for changing the appearance of chat windows with motifs...(CSS files)."

In a 2008 overview of extensions for Firefox in Linux Journal, Dan Sawyer described ChatZilla as an "oldie-but-goodie", "venerable", "with all the trimmings", "handsomely organizes chat channels, logs, has an extensive built-in list of available channels, supports DCC chats and file transfers, and has its own plugin and theming architecture." The application "implements all the standards very well, and for those who prefer to keep desktop clutter to a minimum but still enjoy fighting with random strangers on IRC, ChatZilla is a must-have."

== Forks ==
=== Ambassador ===
Ambassador is a fork of ChatZilla compatible with Pale Moon, Basilisk, and Interlink Mail & News.

== See also ==
- Comparison of Internet Relay Chat clients
- List of free and recommended Mozilla WebExtensions
- List of Internet Relay Chat commands
