= Ircle =

IRC client

- Developer: Onno Tijdgat
- Stable release: 3.5a6 (November 17, 2007; 18 years ago) [±]
- Written in: C
- Operating system: macOS, Classic Mac OS
- Platform: x86, PowerPC
- Type: IRC client
- License: Proprietary
- Website: https://www.ircle.com/

Ircle (formerly rendered as "IRCle") was an IRC client developed by Onno Tijdgat for the Macintosh computer platform. Ircle was shareware, with free upgrades. The client was scriptable with AppleScript, supported multiple channels and servers, and up to ten simultaneous connections. It was discontinued in 2009. Since 2012, Ircle was not compatible with most recent versions of OS X, and no updates were available. In December 2017 the Ircle home page displayed a poll, to end Q2 2018, to determine whether a new version should be released on OS X and iOS. The results of the poll were 311 votes in favor of a new Mac OS version, 43 votes for an iOS version, and 117 votes for both a Mac OS and iOS version, out of 528 votes cast.

== History ==
Ircle was originally written in THINK Pascal by Olaf Titz and released in 1993, with the source code licensed under the GPL up to version 1.56. Titz then gave up on the project and Tijdgat took over. Tijdgat continued development privately, rewriting it in C under Metrowerks CodeWarrior Pro and updating it for the then-new Power Macs. Ircle 3.0 was released in 1994. The Talk City internet chat service supported Ircle, and as of 2000, negotiated for a custom version called "Talk City Ircle", free for subscribers, with "comparable features without the disruption" from flood attacks.

Tijdgat announced in December 2005 that extensive work was underway to update Ircle for x86 based Macs. The upgrades were to be backward compatible with older CPUs, while development for Mac OS 7, 8, and 9 would cease. On September 21, 2006, the Intel compatible (universal binary) version was released with a number of new features.

== Features ==
Ircle supported up to ten simultaneous server connections, and comes configured with a "long list of servers". The "channelbar" feature simplified managing the otherwise large number of windows in Ircle. Applescript allowed detailed control and modification of the client. Third party developer Public Access Software hosted Ircle Scripting Resources, Applescript scripts for Ircle-based tools, applications and even games, until 1999. The Ircle "faces" window displays updateable images of chat contacts.

== Reception ==
Ircle was once described as "the most widely used IRC client for Macintosh computers", "stable, full-featured", with "good user support," and "one of the best" Mac IRC clients. The "one downside" to Ircle was "a rather intimidating preferences dialog". One author described it as "the godfather of Mac IRC clients. It has been around the longest and has the most features, making it the de facto gold standard against which all other clients compare themselves."

== See also ==
- Comparison of Internet Relay Chat clients
