= Snak =

IRC client

- Original author: Kent Sorensen
- Initial release: 3 March 1997
- Stable release: 5.3.4 (March 11, 2012; 14 years ago) [±]
- Operating system: Classic Mac OS, Mac OS X
- Platform: x86
- Type: IRC client
- License: Proprietary

Snak (Danish for "chat") was a shareware Internet Relay Chat (IRC) client written by Kent Sorensen for the Macintosh platform. Snak was distributed as shareware and could be freely used and evaluated for 30 days at no charge. After the 30-day evaluation period has ended, the program would quit after 15 minutes of use, and a registration key had to be purchased. Versions up to 4.12 run on both Mac OS 9 and Mac OS X while version 5 and newer only support Mac OS X. The program is Intel-only as of version 5.3.4. The program is not fully compatible with current macOS versions and is no longer supported, with the developer stating that he is unable to create new versions due to the deprecation of the Carbon libraries. On 10 October 2018, Snak was made freeware with a license key published on the project's website.

== Features ==
Snak supports an unlimited number of connections and channels, private chats, as well as full DCC support for file transfers and chat. It can be scripted with AppleScript and the ircII scripting language. Snak features an Actions list which makes it easy to automate responses to many common events on IRC.

Snak includes the ability for multiple panels to share the windows. A panel can contain a channel, a dialog with another user, a list, or information about a DCC file transfer. This results in an effective use of the screen space and improves the ability to follow multiple channels. A panel can be moved from one window to another by dragging the title bar or the panel tab.

Although limited support UTF-8 support has been included since version 5.1.5 (released 2006-09-23), as of 30 December 2014, full UTF-8 support is still lacking (promised for "the next major version").

== Reception ==
Jason Parker, Assistant editor for Download.com, wrote for CNET Reviews on 26 May 2005, "If you want a great IRC chat client for Mac, Snak is hands-down the best in the category."
