= Nettalk (IRC client) =

IRC Client for Windows

- Stable release: 6.7.16 (October 30, 2012; 12 years ago) [±]
- Operating system: Windows
- Type: IRC-Client
- License: Apache license 2.0
- Website: www.ntalk.de/Nettalk/en/

Nettalk is a free and open-source IRC Client for Windows. It is a fully-fledged IRC client with UTF-8 and DCC file transfer support. The program is available in Dutch, English, French, German, Hungarian, Italian, Russian, Simplified Chinese, Spanish and Swedish as of version 6.7.13.

== Features ==
Nettalk can manage multiple connections, the preferences of which are stored individually. This includes NickServ identities and visited channels. Nettalk completes commands, nicks and parameters automatically. Command syntax for typed in commands are displayed to the user like in modern software development environments. Commands can be searched for by their function, as well as by name. Also, there is the ability to show private messages in full-screen applications, and a spell checker for German and English. Nettalk supports mouse gestures since version 6.5.

The program also contains a script function. Nettalk's scripting uses a BASIC dialect, which is supported by syntax highlighting.

== Reception ==
In its review of Nettalk 6.6.5, NetzWelt.de stated, "the graphical interface makes it easy to get started with this powerful ... software".

== See also ==
- Comparison of IRC Clients
