= Colloquy (software) =

IRC client

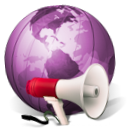

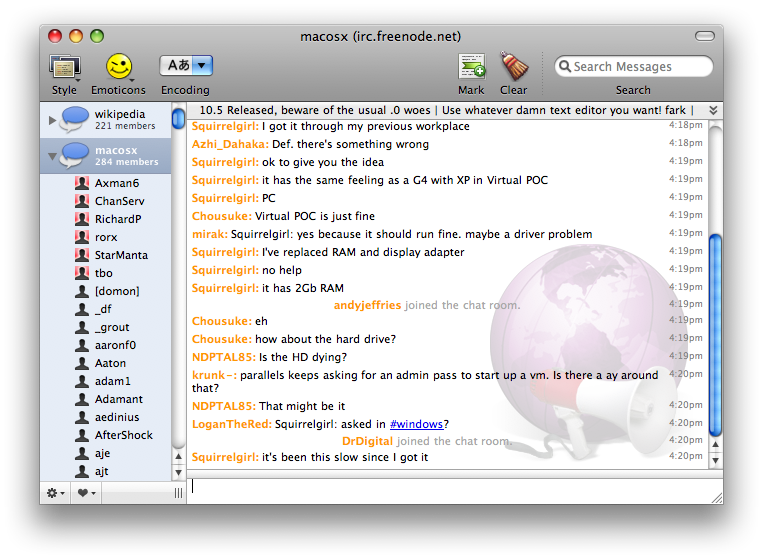
- Colloquy 2.1 under Mac OS X 10.5.1, Mobile Colloquy 1.0.1 under iOS
- Developer: Timothy (xenon)
- Release: 2004
- Stable release: 2.4.3 (6011) (March 22, 2014; 12 years ago) [±]
- Preview release: None [±]
- Written in: Objective-C
- Operating system: macOS, iOS
- Available in: English
- Type: IRC client
- License: Desktop: GPL; Mobile: BSD license
- Website: colloquy.app
- Repository: github.com/colloquy/colloquy

Colloquy is an open-source IRC, SILC, ICB and XMPP client for Mac OS X. Colloquy uses its own core, known as Chat Core, although in the past it used Irssi as its IRC protocol engine. One of the primary goals behind Colloquy was to create an IRC, SILC and ICB client with Mac OS X visuals. Colloquy contains a user interface that follows Apple's Human interface guidelines in addition to containing support for traditional IRC command-line controls such as /nick and /join.

An official app for iOS was released and features support for all IRC commands, a built-in browser, push notifications and other features.

== Features ==
Colloquy supports a variety of different text modifications. One text manipulation supported by Colloquy is the use of colors as used by mIRC; with the primary colors being: White, Black, Navy, Forest, Red, Maroon, Purple, Orange, Yellow, Green, Teal, Cyan, Blue, Magenta, Grey, and Ash. Additionally, Colloquy supports formatting text with underlining, italics, bold, and outline.

Colloquy supports scripting in languages such as AppleScript, F-Script, JavaScript, Objective-C and Python. Colloquy shows changes such as mode changes, ban sets, etc. in a human-readable format, rather than showing raw modes.

== Plugins and customizability ==
Colloquy is built on Apple's WebKit engine and supports customizable message views called "styles" using a combination of XSLT, HTML, CSS and JavaScript. These act like themes, altering the way the application displays chat sessions. The software also supports a wide array of plugins that enable customization of the application and integration with other aspects of the Mac OS X environment.

The Colloquy Web Interface plugin allows monitoring of the Colloguy desktop IRC connection from an iPhone's Safari browser, or any web browser.

== Reception ==
Both the desktop client and the mobile (iPhone) client have received positive reviews. The desktop client was selected as a Pick of the Week on MacOSXHints.com.

The Colloquy iPhone app was favorably reviewed on Ars Technica, The Unofficial Apple Weblog, GigaOM, and AppleInsider.

== See also ==
- Comparison of IRC clients
- Comparison of cross-platform instant messaging clients
- Comparison of instant messaging protocols
