= AmIRC =

IRC client for the Amiga

- Developer: VaporWare
- Stable release: 3.9 / 2 March 2023
- Operating system: AmigaOS, MorphOS
- Type: IRC client
- License: Freeware
- Website: https://www.amirc.org/

AmIRC is an MUI-based IRC client for the Amiga. First released in 1995 as a shareware, it was later open-sourced. AmIRC offers large degree of configuration with an easy-to-use interface.

== History ==
Developed by Oliver Wagner (VaporWare) and first released in 1995, AmIRC was then in a direct competition with fellow Amiga IRC client, Grapevine. The application was originally distributed as a shareware product: as such, it allowed the user to run the software, but only for 30 minutes at a time over a 30 day period. AmIRC was included in the Amiga Surfer Pack, a package containing several Internet related applications, released by the Amiga Technologies in 1996.

Last major AmIRC version released by VaporWare was 3.5 in 2000, beta releases continued until 2002. Development restarted in 2007, when Nicolas Sallin introduced with a consent of VaporWare an unofficial AmIRC port for MorphOS and later also for AmigaOS 3.x, a keyfile was no longer necessary. Another development branch was started in 2011 by Costel Mincea for AmigaOS4, this fork was open sourced in 2012.

== Features ==
The software permits a large degree of configuration, with users having control over text styles, colors, and sound effects. It requires MUI (Magic User Interface) and supports ARexx scripting language allowing other applications to integrate with it. Among other features, it is possible to log-in to selected IRC channels at startup. The software also supports IRC-like Arcnet chat system created by the same author and used by the Amiga Technologies for their internal communication.

== Reception ==
AmIRC was well regarded in its time. By words of the CU Amiga magazine reviewer: "one of the most polished Internet clients ever seen on any platform" Commended were its easy-to-use interface, high degree of customization and good documentation. On the downside, CU Amiga review mildly criticized inclusion of only a few entries for the United Kingdom market in the default phone book. There were also some limitations despite the rich features, although AmIRC (version 2.0 reviewed) could connect to multiple channels, it was not able to connect to multiple channels on multiple servers.

The IRC client XChat, released in 1998 for Unix-like systems and later for Windows, based its graphical user interface closely on AmIRC.
