= BitchX =

Free IRC client

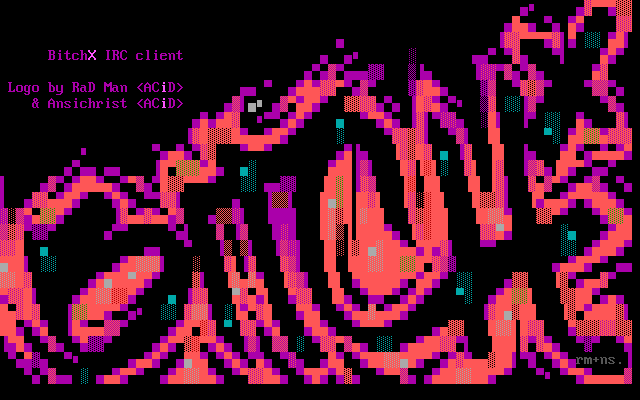
- Developers: Colten Edwards (panasync) and Kevin Easton (caf)
- Stable release: 1.2.1 / 14 November 2014
- Preview release: BitchX-1.3 (January 1, 2013; 12 years ago) [±]
- Repository: sourceforge.net/p/bitchx/git/ci/master/tree/
- Written in: C
- Operating system: Unix, Linux, FreeBSD, OpenBSD, NetBSD, Solaris, Windows, OS X
- Type: IRC client
- License: BSD 3-clause license
- Website: bitchx.sourceforge.net

BitchX /ˈbɪtʃɛks/ is a free IRC client that has been regarded as the most popular ircII-based IRC client. The initial implementation, written by "Trench" and "HappyCrappy", was a script for the IrcII chat client. It was converted to a program in its own right by panasync (Colten Edwards). BitchX 1.1 final was released in 2004. It is written in C and is a TUI application utilizing ncurses. GTK+ toolkit support has been dropped. It works on all Unix-like operating systems, and is distributed under a BSD license. It was originally based on ircII-EPIC, and eventually it was merged into the EPIC IRC client. It supports IPv6, multiple servers and SSL, and a subset of UTF-8 (characters contained in ISO-8859-1) with an unofficial patch.

On several occasions, BitchX has been noted to be a popular IRC client for Unix-like systems.

The latest official release is version 1.2.

BitchX does not yet support Unicode.

== Security ==
It was known that early versions of BitchX were vulnerable to a denial-of-service attack in that they could be caused to crash by passing specially-crafted strings as arguments to certain IRC commands. This was before format string attacks became a well-known class of vulnerability.

The previous version of BitchX, released in 2004, has security problems allowing remote IRC servers to execute arbitrary code on the client's machine (CVE-2007-3360, CVE-2007-4584).

On April 26, 2009, Slackware removed BitchX from its distribution, citing the numerous unresolved security issues.

The aforementioned vulnerabilities were fixed in the sources for the 1.2 release.

== See also ==
- Comparison of Internet Relay Chat clients
- Internet Relay Chat
- Internet Relay Chat Client
