= Pirch (company) =

American appliances company

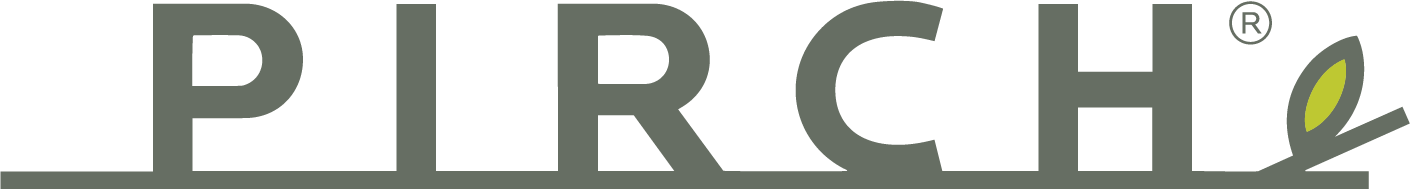
- Company type: Private
- Industry: Retail
- Founded: 2009; 17 years ago San Diego, California
- Founder: Jeffrey Sears
- Defunct: 2024; 2 years ago
- Headquarters: San Diego, California
- Number of locations: 7 (before closure)
- Area served: Southern California, United States
- Key people: Steve Smith (CEO of PIRCH)
- Products: Appliances
- Revenue: ▲US$150 Million
- Owner: L Catterton
- Number of employees: 450
- Website: pirch.com

Pirch (stylized as PIRCH) was a fixture and appliance retailer for kitchen, bath and outdoor products based in San Diego, California. Founded in 2009, the company expanded to ten metropolitan markets throughout the United States before pulling back to its four California stores in 2017. The stores feature an experiential showroom that allows consumers to test living appliances and bathroom plumbing fixtures as they would in their homes, while being advised by sales consultants.

== History ==
The company was founded in San Diego in 2009 by a team of businessmen including Phil Roxworthy, James Fikes, and Tom Cavallo, under Rox Design DBA Fixtures Kitchen Bath Outdoor.

On February 26, 2013, the private equity firm Catterton Partners announced its investment in Pirch as a minority shareholder.

In September 2017, the company announced a change of focus, closing all its stores outside of California.

=== Closure and controversies ===
In March 2024, Pirch announced that it would be pausing operations until further notice. As a result, the remaining 6 showrooms in California and its distribution centers would be temporarily closed. This raised concern and frustration from customers, worrying that the company was winding down operations and that it would be preparing to file for bankruptcy.

On March 28, 2024, Pirch was sued by multiple parties for up to $5 million for unpaid rent and inventory at its closed showrooms. On April 12, 2024, it was reported that Pirch had filed a layoff notice that would affect 40 employees at the Westfield UTC, Mission Viejo, and Laguna Niguel locations.

On April 15, 2024, Marshall Krupp, a customer affected in the Pirch closure, announced that he was seeking a fraud investigation from San Diego and Orange County prosecutors against Pirch. Krupp stated that he lost up to $46,373 for kitchen appliances purchased between August 2022 and January 2023.

On April 17, 2024, Worldpay and American Express sued Pirch for a combined total of $43 million over disputed transactions against its customers. On April 19, 2024, Pirch announced that it would be permanently shutting down after 14 years of operation. As a result, the formerly temporarily closure of Pirch's stores was now permanent, and would not reopen. On April 22, 2024, Pirch filed for Chapter 7 bankruptcy liquidation, listing liabilities of $100 million to $500 million, and assets of $10 million to $50 million.
