= Flood control (communications) =

Communication protocol feature

In communications, flood control is a feature of many communication protocols designed to prevent the overwhelming of a destination receiver. Such controls can be implemented either in software or in hardware, and will often request that the message be resent after the receiver has finished processing.

Internet forums often use a flood control mechanism to prevent too many messages from being posted at once, either to prevent spamming or denial-of-service attacks. Internet Relay Chat servers will often quit users performing IRC floods with an "Excess Flood" message.
