= Bersirc =

Former Internet Relay Chat client

- Original author(s): Jamie Frater
- Developer(s): Nicholas Copeland
- Stable release: 2.2.14 / 12 August 2005
- Written in: C
- Operating system: Windows
- Type: IRC client
- License: LGPL
- Website: bersirc.free2code.net

Bersirc is a discontinued open-source Internet Relay Chat client for the Microsoft Windows operating system. Linux and Mac OS X versions were "in development". Bersirc uses the Claro toolkit, which aims to provide an interface to native windowing systems and widgets on all operating systems. Microsoft .NET and Qt toolkit ports were also planned. The final version of Bersirc was 2.2.14.

== Features ==
Bersirc features connections to multiple servers, a finger client, DCC File Transfers and Chat, Smart Paste, Object Pascal Scripting, Internet Time Support (Swatch Netbeats), Channel Lists, Favorite Channels list, Ident Server, AutoJoin on Invite, AutoRejoin on Kick, configurable date formats, an ICQ-like notify list, advanced filtering, a configurable user interface, and a built in IRC user guide.

== License ==
Bersirc was licensed under the GNU Lesser General Public License and there are no plans to change this. Bersirc 2.1 was to be released under the Qt Public License, but the Qt toolkit and license were abandoned.

== History ==
Bersirc was originally written in Delphi by Jamie Frater in 1999 as a Windows-only IRC client, comparable to HydraIRC and Klient. But development stagnated due to his growing responsibilities in real life.

On 10 February 2004 Nicholas Copeland bought the source code from Frater and released it as open-source. The older Delphi client, Bersirc 1.4, was supposed to be maintained under the name Bersirc 1.5. The original site was also archived by the new owner, including all the old plugins and extensions, but there has been almost no information about the future of the legacy clients since.

Developers stated that development of the 1.4 client stalled because the original source code extensively used proprietary software components. The 1.4 client relies on many parts of old versions of the Raize Components package.

The primary developer, Theo Julienne, announced plans to develop the 2.1 branch in C++ using the Qt toolkit, but with the release of the 2.2 branch this was changed to C using Claro Graphics.

== Reception ==
In 2001, New Zealand gaming website GamePlanet recommended Bersirc for users to connect to its IRC services.

Bersirc has received positive reviews. The German website Winfuture referred to version 2.2.13 as a "great free alternative to the popular shareware IRC client mIRC. The program contains only what is necessary for chatting on IRC...". Snapfiles gave the program 3.5/5 stars, referring to it as "feature rich and nicely designed".

== See also ==
- Comparison of Internet Relay Chat clients
