= WeeChat =

IRC client

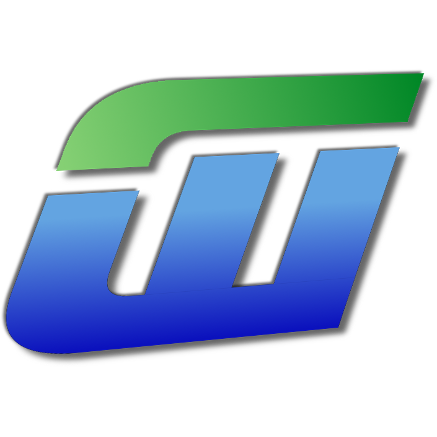

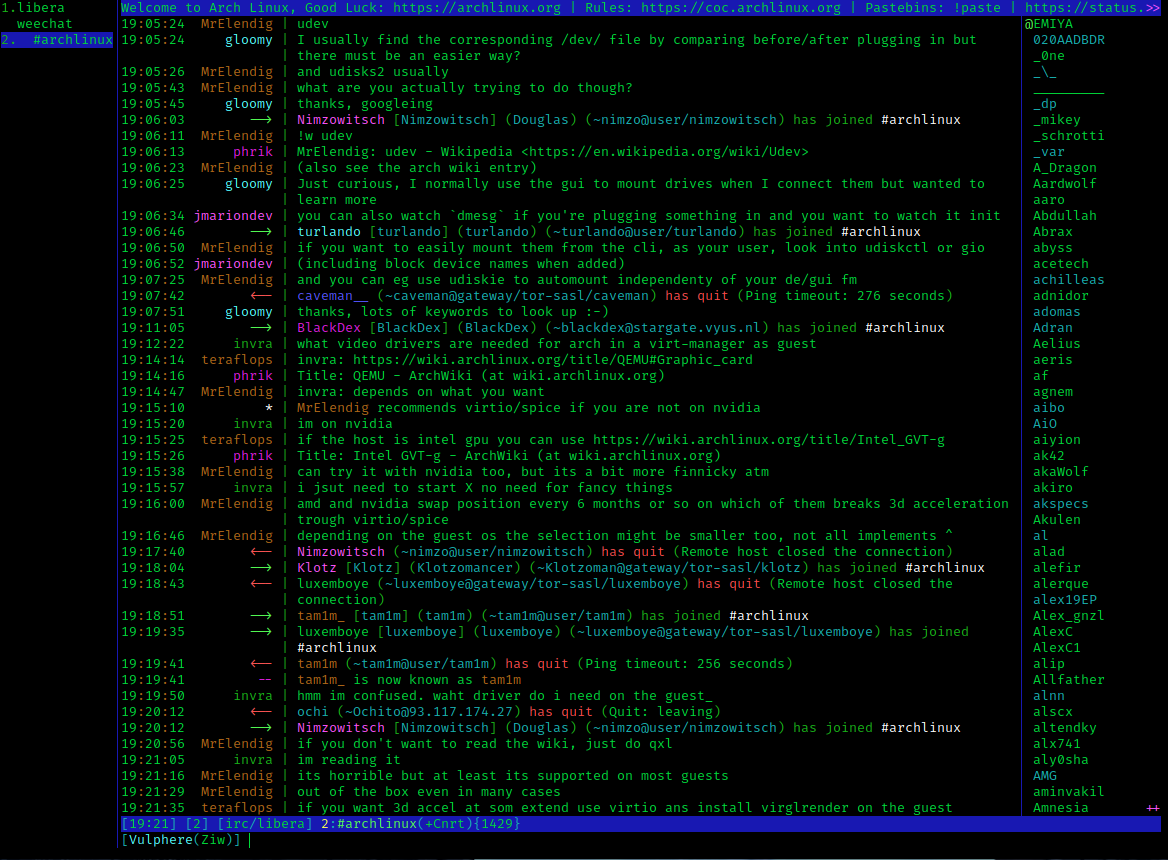
- WeeChat 3.4 with the default configuration
- Developer: Sébastien Helleu
- Release: June 26, 2003; 23 years ago
- Stable release: 4.10.1 / 5 September 2026
- Written in: C
- Operating system: Linux, BSD, OS X, GNU Hurd, Microsoft Windows (using Cygwin)
- Size: 17.2 MB
- Available in: 14 languages
- Type: IRC client
- License: GPL-3.0-or-later
- Website: weechat.org
- Repository: github.com/weechat/weechat

WeeChat (Wee Enhanced Environment for Chat) is a free and open-source Internet Relay Chat client that is designed to be light and fast. It is released under the terms of the GNU GPL-3.0-or-later and has been developed since 2003.

WeeChat comes with a default ncurses interface, and it is possible to use other interfaces (e.g. Glowing Bear, a web frontend) through the use of the relay plugin.

== Features ==
WeeChat's features include:

- IPv6
- SSL
- Proxy connections
- The screen can be split up to display multiple windows at the same time.
- Incremental text search
- Aspell support for spell checking
- Scripting support for many languages (Perl, Python, Ruby, Lua, Tcl, Scheme with GNU Guile, JavaScript with V8 (JavaScript engine), PHP)
- FIFO pipes for remote control
- Support for multiple character encodings
- User-defined aliases and shortkeys

== Supported platforms ==
WeeChat supports most platforms and operating systems, including Linux, BSD, macOS, Debian GNU/Hurd, HP-UX, Solaris, QNX, Haiku, and Microsoft Windows (via the Cygwin library and API).

Binary packages and builds of WeeChat are available for installation as well as the source code for self compilation. This includes most Linux distributions and BSD package management systems, such as Debian, Ubuntu, Mandriva Linux, Fedora, Gentoo Linux, Arch Linux, FreeBSD via the FreeBSD Ports system, OpenBSD via the Ports collection, as well on NetBSD via Pkgsrc.

== Reception ==
In his 2005 review for Free Software Magazine, Martin Brown graded WeeChat with 43 points out of a possible 50, noting that "At first glance, WeeChat is not as friendly or easy to use as Rhapsody", but, "There’s a lot of hidden power built into the application", including Python, Perl, Ruby and Lua extensions which can be selected at installation.

== See also ==
- Comparison of Internet Relay Chat clients
- List of Internet Relay Chat commands
- irssi
