= PJIRC =

Web-based open-source IRC client written in Java

- Developer: Philippe 'Plouf' Detournay
- Release: May 31, 2002
- Final release: 2.2.1 (November 29, 2004; 21 years ago) [±]
- Written in: Java
- Platform: Java SE
- Type: IRC client
- License: GNU General Public License
- Website: pjirc.com
- Repository: sourceforge.net/projects/pjirc/

Plouf's Java IRC (PJIRC) is a web-based open-source IRC client that is written in Java. Any web browser that supports the Java Runtime Environment, or an alternative Java interpreter, can use the applet. Many IRC networks have a public installation of the applet for their network.

Philippe Detournay, the initial and main contributor, has stopped working on the project since 2005. However, the website forum is still frequently used and moderated by the administrators.

== Features ==
Unlike many other Java applet IRC clients, PJIRC supports DCC connections, and can be run in application mode, without the need of either website or browser, though still requiring some form of Java Runtime Environment. Text highlighting, UTF-8 encoding, nickname autocompletion, auto-linking of nicknames, channel names and URLs, customization through the use of plug-ins, limited scripting using JavaScript, and GUI aesthetic customization are supported.

PJIRC can be embedded on a website as a general purpose IRC client, or with optional customization to connect to a particular server and channel, with certain specified commands permitted to users.

Language support uses external language files, and includes Albanian, Bulgarian, Catalan, Chinese, Czech, Danish, Dutch, English, Spanish, Estonian, French, Galician, German, Greek, Hungarian, Italian, Korean, Norwegian, Polish, Portuguese, Romanian, Russian, Serbian, Swedish, Turkish, and Ukrainian.

== See also ==
- Comparison of IRC clients
- Web chat
