= XChat (IRC client) =

IRC client

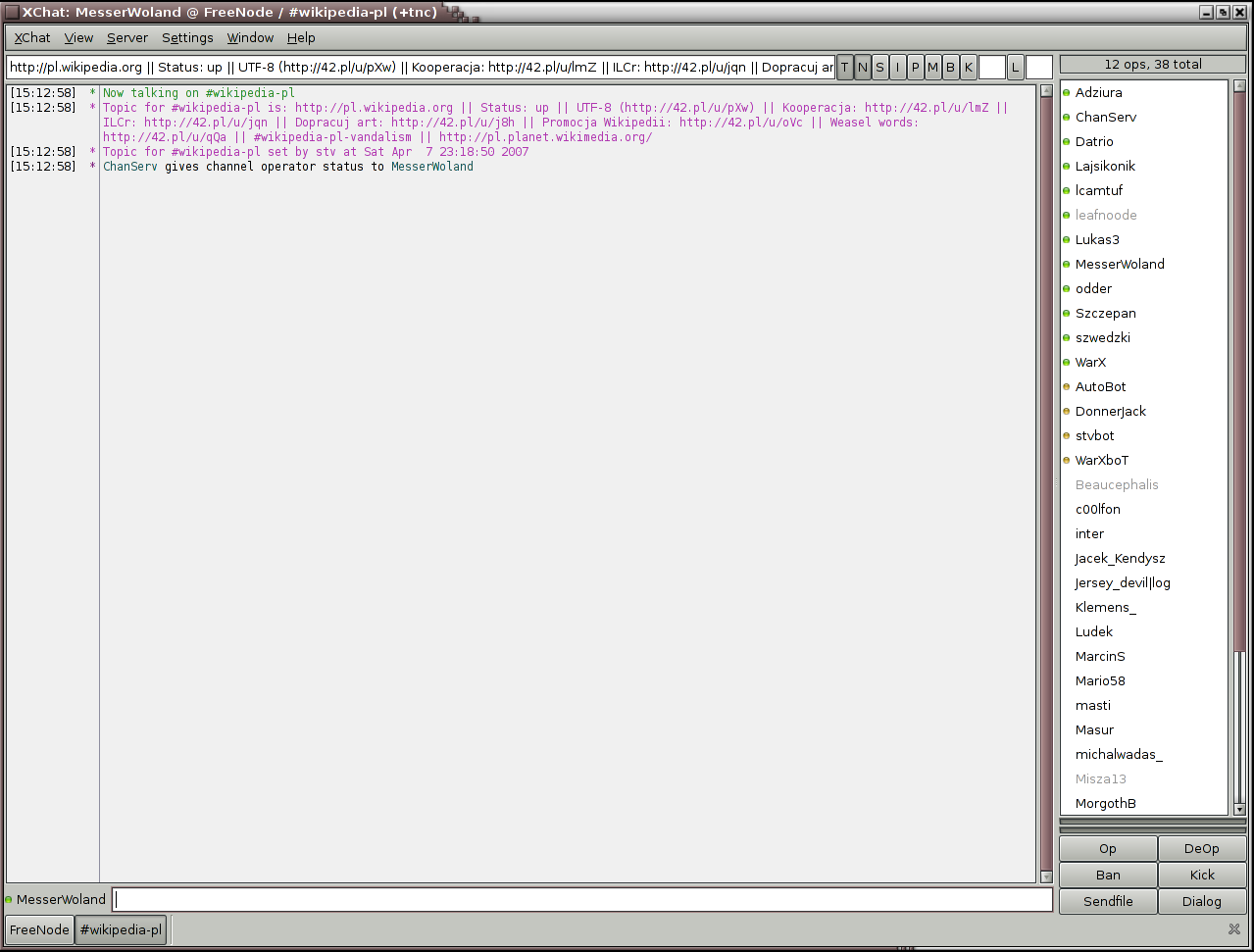
- Screenshot of XChat 2.8.0
- Developer: Peter Železný (zed)
- Release: X-Chat 1.0.0: June 29, 1999; 27 years ago
- Final release: 2.8.9 / 28 August 2010; 16 years ago
- Written in: C
- Operating system: macOS, Unix-like, Windows
- Platform: Cross-platform
- Available in: Multilingual
- Type: IRC client
- License: GPL-2.0-or-later
- Website: xchat.org

XChat (originally styled X-Chat) is an Internet Relay Chat client. It has a tabbed document interface or tree interface, support for multiple servers, and numerous configuration options.

XChat was initially developed in the late 1990s for Unix-like systems, with a graphical user interface patterned closely after the contemporary Commodore Amiga IRC client AmIRC. Support for Microsoft Windows was officially added in 2001, with the Windows build becoming shareware in 2004.

Several third party builds of X-Chat were released under the GPL (see derivative software); these included free Windows builds and derivatives with native support for macOS's Aqua interface. After development stalled in 2013, it was largely superseded by a popular fork called HexChat.

== Features ==
The Internet Relay Chat client offers a graphical user interface surrounding the basic chat window. It includes all basic functionality found in most other IRC clients, including nick completion, connecting to multiple servers, secure connections, Client-to-client protocol, Direct Client-to-Client file transfers and chats, and a plugin system for various programming languages (including at least C or C++, Perl, Python, Tcl, Ruby, Lua, CLISP, D, and DMDScript). Plugins allow extending the features and customization of the functionality of XChat.

The default view for the client window is referred to as "tree view", but can be configured for a tabbed interface instead. Tabs change color as text arrives, other users enter or leave channels, or another user addresses the user's nickname. The interface can display clickable operator ("op") commands and others, and allows customization of fonts, event sounds, timestamps, and logging. XChat implements all standard IRC commands (e.g. /NICK or /JOIN), as well as DCC chatting (/CHAT), which allows chat to continue if the IRC server is disconnected.

The client runs on Unix-like operating systems, and many Linux distributions include packages in their repositories.

== History ==
=== Background ===
The program, originally styled "X-Chat", was developed by Peter "zed" Zelezny as an IRC client for UNIX-based systems. Version 0.0.1 dated to 1998, with the earliest source file of that version dated June 29, 1998. Zelezny previously had a history of writing software for the Commodore Amiga BBS software MAXs BBS, including the original versions of File Lister Express.

The user interface of X-Chat was designed to closely resemble that of AmIRC, a GUI-based IRC client for the Commodore Amiga originally released in 1995. Design features emulated include the use of colored LED-style icons to denote channel operator status, action buttons beneath the userlist, an editable topic field with channel modes denoted by clickable buttons, and a list of joined channels as a row of buttons at the window.

=== Initial versions ===
Version 1.0.0 was released on June 29, 1999.

Version 1.7.7, released on June 13, 2001, added support for a Microsoft Windows build of X-Chat, incorporating some code from on Alex Badea's 1.5.11win32 port.

Version 2.0.0 was announced on February 12, 2003. Around this version, the program's name in the title bar officially changed its spelling from "X-Chat" to "XChat".

=== Move to shareware ===
On August 23, 2004, beginning with version 2.4.0, the Windows build of X-Chat was made shareware, due to the additional time and expense incurred in making Windows builds. Registrations were available online for a one-time fee of $20 US or $25 Australian; purchasers received a keyfile which allowed the software to be used after the 30-day evaluation period. The Linux builds remained freeware.

The move created controversy, as it was argued that Peter Železný did not have the copyright to all of the code which he was claiming to re-license, as well as linking proprietary shareware enforcement code against GPL-licensed code, making the Windows version of XChat a violation of copyright law and the GPL.

However, the source code remained freely available under the GPL, and unofficial third-party Windows builds quickly became popular; most notably, a build by Vaidrius 'SilvereX' Petrauskas, which was maintained until version 2.8.6-2 in August 2009. This was followed in 2010 by XChat-WDK (XChat Windows Driver Kit), a patchset by Patrick Griffis based on the main XChat SVN repository.

=== Discontinuation ===
The last Linux release of XChat was version 2.8.8, released on May 30, 2010. This was followed by version 2.8.9, a Windows-only update released on August 28, 2010.

Development of the third-party XChat Windows fork XChat-WDK would continue, which added various additional features including 64-bit builds, Lua support, and a text-based console mode. The build was also expanded to run on other platforms. On July 6, 2012, XChat-WDK evolved into HexChat.

While some work on the original XChat continued, the last commit to the project's Subversion repository was made on July 13, 2013, and the client received no further official releases. Some Linux distributions, such as Fedora, maintained their own versions to fix bugs, keep the program working and able to build, and to resolve security issues. Eventually, some distributions would ultimately deprecate XChat in favor of HexChat in their software repositories.

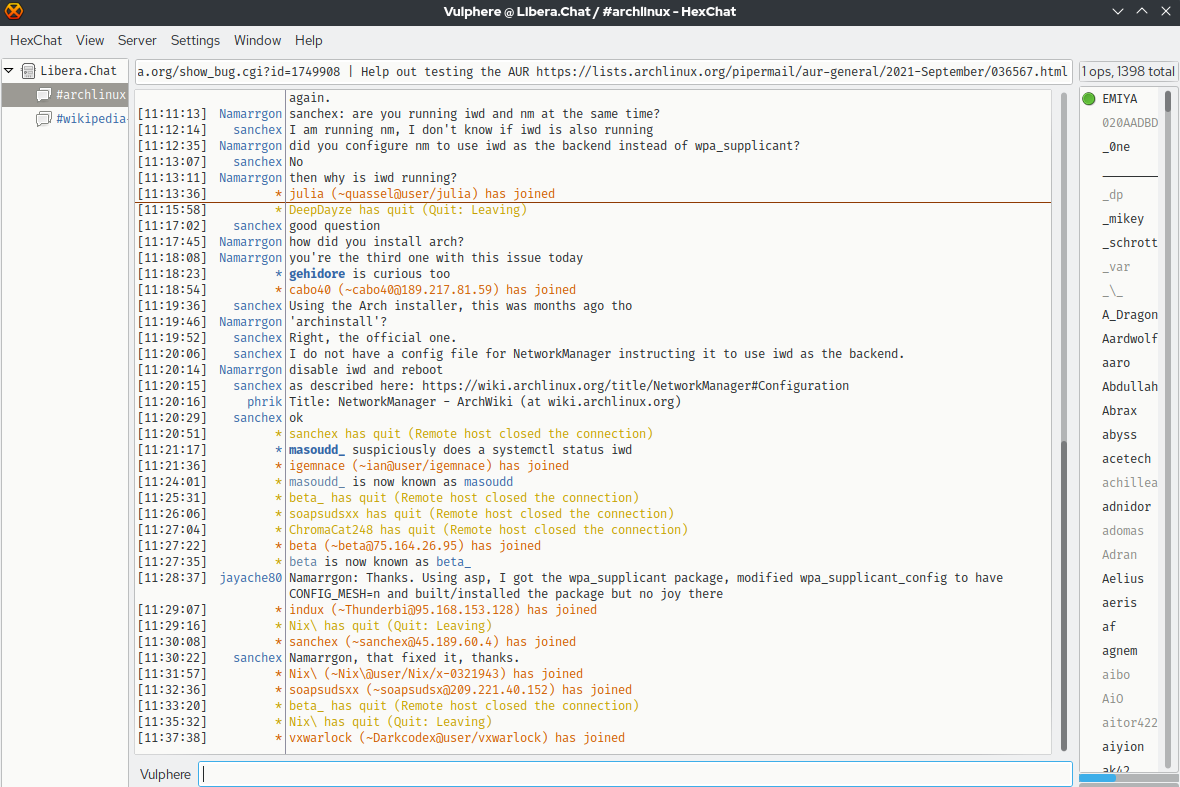
HexChat 2.16.0

HexChat was in turn discontinued in early 2024, citing lack of maintainer availability. The last version was 2.16.2, released on February 9. Following HexChat end-of-life, development continued on a community fork named ZoiteChat.

== Derivative software ==
- Silverex's Windows build based on XChat 2.8.6 (discontinued)
- XChat Aqua or XChat Azure for macOS
- XChat Gnome
- lurc, an IRC client based on XChat 1.0
- XChat (SE)

== Reception ==
XChat has been described as popular, buildable for a variety of platforms. In its heyday it was rated one of the best IRC clients for Linux. IRC Hacks: 100 Industrial-Strength Tips & Tools goes into depth explaining its setup, configuration, and advanced features under Unix and macOS.

In 2000, Robin Miller writing for The Washington Post described XChat as "the best Internet Relay Chat client I've ever used on any operating system, period."

== See also ==
- Comparison of IRC clients
