= IrcII =

Oldest still active developed IRC-Client

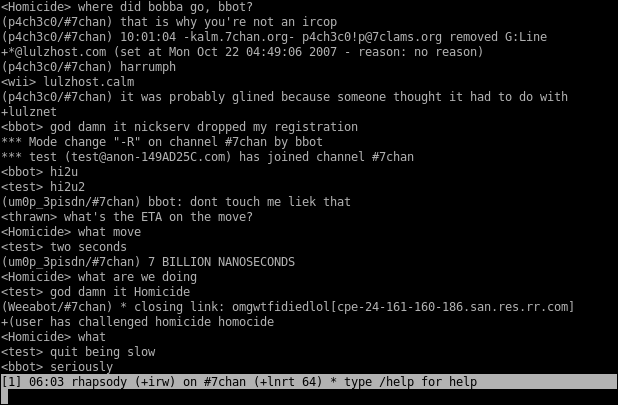
- ircII client session
- Original author(s): Michael Sandrof
- Developer(s): Matthew R. Green, ircII project
- Initial release: 1989; 36 years ago
- Stable release: 20240111 / 11 January 2024
- Written in: C
- Operating system: Unix-like
- Size: 577 kB
- Available in: English
- Type: IRC client
- Licence: BSD-3-Clause
- Website: www.eterna23.net/ircii/

ircII (pronounced i-r-c-two or irk-two, and sometimes referred to as IRC client, second edition) is a free, open-source Unix IRC and ICB client written in C. Initially released in the late 1980s, it is the oldest IRC client still maintained.

== History ==
Several other UNIX IRC clients, including BitchX, EPIC, and ScrollZ, were originally forks of ircII. It was the first client to implement file transfer capabilities over IRC. The CTCP protocol was implemented by Michael Sandrof in 1990 for version 2.1. The DCC protocol was implemented by Troy Rollo in 1991 for version 2.1.2, and was never intended to be portable to other IRC clients.

== Features ==
ircII is written in the C programming language and implements a termcap, text-mode, user interface. Encrypted Transport Layer Security connections to IRC servers are established with the OpenSSL library. The concept of file transfers over IRC networks was first implemented by the authors of ircII. The client was the first to implement both the Client-to-client protocol (CTCP) and the Direct Client-to-Client (DCC) protocol. The application has been promoted as being "fast, stable, lightweight, portable, and easily backgrounded."

== See also ==
- Comparison of Internet Relay Chat clients
- Internet Citizen's Band (ICB)
- List of Internet Relay Chat commands
