= MIRC =

Internet Relay Chat (IRC) client for Microsoft Windows

mIRC

- Screenshot of an unmodified mIRC 7.27 running on Windows 7
- Original author: Khaled Mardam-Bey
- Developer: mIRC Co. Ltd.
- Release: 28 February 1995
- Stable release: 7.85 (9 September 2026) [±]
- Written in: C/C++
- Operating system: Windows XP and later
- Platform: IA-32
- Type: IRC client
- License: Proprietary/Trialware
- Website: www.mirc.com

mIRC is an IRC client for Windows with an integrated scripting language allowing the creation of extensions. The software was first released in 1995 and has since been described as "one of the most popular IRC clients available for Windows." mIRC is shareware and requires payment for registration after the 30-day evaluation period.

== History ==
mIRC was created by Khaled Mardam-Bey, a British programmer born in Jordan to a Syrian father and a Palestinian mother. He began developing the software in late 1994, and released its first version on 28 February 1995.

Mardam-Bey states that he decided to create mIRC because he felt the first IRC clients for Windows lacked some basic IRC features. He then continued developing it due to the challenge and the fact that people appreciated his work. The author states that its subsequent popularity allowed him to make a living out of mIRC. He also jokingly states that the "m" in mIRC stands for "moo" or "MU" (meaning 'nothing' in Japanese and Korean).

mIRC 5.91 is the final version to support 16-bit Windows; 6.35 is the last to support Windows 95, NT 4.0, 98, and ME. The current version supports Windows XP and later.

The application makes an appearance in the 2006 music video for "Boten Anna" by Swedish singer Basshunter.

== Main features ==
mIRC has a number of distinguishing features. One is its scripting language which is further developed with each version. The scripting language can be used to make minor changes to the program like custom commands (aliases), but can also used to completely alter the behavior and appearance of mIRC. Another claimed feature is mIRC's file sharing abilities, via the DCC protocol, featuring a built-in file server.

Starting with mIRC 7.1, released on 30 July 2010, Unicode and IPv6 are supported.

=== mIRC scripting ===
mIRC's abilities and behaviors can be altered and extended using the embedded mIRC scripting language. mIRC includes its own GUI scripting editor, with help that has been described as "extremely detailed".

Due to the level of access the language has to a user's computer — for example, being able to rename and delete files — a number of abusive scripts have been made. One example of abuse was that executed with the $decode identifier which decodes a given encoded string. The issue was reported in August 2001; even five months later, users were still being reported as having fallen prey, tricked into executing commands on their systems which result in "handing control of [their] mIRC over to somebody else". This led to changes being made in mIRC version 6.17: according to the author, $decode is now disabled by default, and various other features which can be considered dangerous are now lockable.

== Reception ==
mIRC has been downloaded over 40 million times from CNET's Download.com service. In 2003, Nielsen/NetRatings ranked mIRC among the top ten most popular Internet applications.
