= List of computing and IT abbreviations =

This is a list of computing and IT acronyms, initialisms and abbreviations.

== 0–9 ==
- 0-day—Zero-day vulnerability
- 1GL—First-generation programming language
- 1NF—First normal form
- 10B2—10BASE-2
- 10B5—10BASE-5
- 10B-F—10BASE-F
- 10B-FB—10BASE-FB
- 10B-FL—10BASE-FL
- 10B-FP—10BASE-FP
- 10B-T—10BASE-T
- 100B-FX—100BASE-FX
- 100B-TX—100BASE-TX
- 100BVG—100BASE-VG
- 286—Intel 80286 processor
- 2B1Q—2 binary 1 quaternary
- 2FA—Two-factor authentication
- 2GL—Second-generation programming language
- 2NF—Second normal form
- 3DES—Triple Data Encryption Standard
- 3GL—Third-generation programming language
- 3GPP—3rd Generation Partnership Project – 3G comms
- 3GPP2—3rd Generation Partnership Project 2
- 3NF—Third normal form
- 386—Intel 80386 processor
- 486—Intel 80486 processor
- 4B5BLF—4-bit 5-bit local fiber
- 4GL—Fourth-generation programming language
- 4NF—Fourth normal form
- 5GL—Fifth-generation programming language
- 5NF—Fifth normal form
- 6NF—Sixth normal form
- 8B10BLF—8-bit 10-bit local fiber
- 802.11—wireless LAN
- 8D—Eight disciplines problem solving

== A ==
- A11Y—Accessibility
- AAA—Authentication, authorization, and accounting
- AABB—Axis-aligned bounding box
- AAC—Advanced Audio Coding
- AAL—ATM Adaptation Layer
- AALC—ATM Adaptation Layer Connection
- AARP—AppleTalk Address Resolution Protocol
- ABAC—Attribute-Based Access Control
- ABCL—Actor-Based Concurrent Language
- ABI—Application Binary Interface
- ABM—Asynchronous Balanced Mode
- ABR—Area Border Router
- ABR—Auto Baud-Rate detection
- ABR—Available Bitrate
- ABR—Average Bitrate
- ABR—Adaptive Bitrate (Streaming)
- AC—Acoustic Coupler
- AC—Alternating Current
- AC—Authorization certificate
- ACD—Automatic Call Distributor
- ACE—Advanced Computing Environment
- ACID—Atomicity Consistency Isolation Durability
- ACK—Acknowledgement
- ACK—Amsterdam Compiler Kit
- ACL—Access Control List
- ACL—Active Current Loop
- ACM—Association for Computing Machinery
- ACME—Automated Classification of Medical Entities
- ACP—Airline Control Program
- ACPI—Advanced Configuration and Power Interface
- ACR—Allowed Cell Rate
- ACR—Attenuation to Crosstalk Ratio
- AD—Active Directory
- AD—Administrative Domain
- ADC—Analog-to-Digital Converter
- ADC—Apple Display Connector
- ADB—Apple Desktop Bus
- ADCCP—Advanced Data Communications Control Procedures
- ACE—Advanced Computing Environment
- ADDS—Applied Digital Data Systems
- ADO—ActiveX Data Objects
- ADSL—Asymmetric Digital Subscriber Line
- ADT—Abstract Data Type
- AE—Adaptive Equalizer
- AE—Authenticated encryption
- AEAD—Authenticated encryption with associated data
- AES—Advanced Encryption Standard
- AF—Anisotropic Filtering
- AFIPS—American Federation of Information Processing Societies
- AFP—Apple Filing Protocol
- AGI—Artificial General Intelligence
- AGP—Accelerated Graphics Port
- AH—Active Hub
- AH—Authentication Header
- AHCI—Advanced Host Controller Interface
- AI—Artificial Intelligence
- AIS—Automated Indicator Sharing
- AIX—Advanced Interactive eXecutive
- Ajax—Asynchronous JavaScript and XML
- AL—Active Link
- AL—Access List
- ALAC—Apple Lossless Audio Codec
- ALE—Annualized loss expectancy
- ALGOL—Algorithmic Language
- ALSA—Advanced Linux Sound Architecture
- ALU—Arithmetic and Logical Unit
- AM—Access Method
- AM—Active Matrix
- AMOLED—Active-Matrix Organic Light-Emitting Diode
- AMQP—Advanced Message Queuing Protocol
- AM—Active Monitor
- AM—Allied Mastercomputer
- AM—Amplitude Modulation
- AMD—Advanced Micro Devices
- AMI—Amazon Machine Image
- AMQP—Advanced Message Queuing Protocol
- AMR—Audio Modem Riser
- ANN—Artificial Neural Network
- ANSI—American National Standards Institute
- ANT—Another Neat Tool
- AoE—ATA over Ethernet
- AOP—Aspect-Oriented Programming
- AOT—Ahead-Of-Time
- AP—Access point
- APCI—Application-Layer Protocol Control Information
- APFS—Apple File System
- API—Application Programming Interface
- APIC—Advanced Programmable Interrupt Controller
- APIPA—Automatic Private IP Addressing
- APL—A Programming Language
- APR—Apache Portable Runtime
- APT—Advanced persistent threat
- ARC—Adaptive Replacement Cache
- ARC—Advanced RISC Computing
- ARIN—American Registry for Internet Numbers
- ARIS—Architecture of Integrated Information Systems
- ARM—Advanced RISC Machines
- ARO—Annualized rate of occurrence
- AROS—AROS Research Operating System
- ARP—Address Resolution Protocol
- ARPA—Address and Routing Parameter Area
- ARPA—Advanced Research Projects Agency
- ARPANET—Advanced Research Projects Agency Network
- ART—Android Runtime
- AS—Access Server
- ASCII—American Standard Code for Information Interchange
- ASG—Abstract Semantic Graph
- ASK—Amplitude-shift keying
- ASIC—Application-Specific Integrated Circuit
- ASIMO—Advanced Step in Innovative Mobility
- ASLR—Address Space Layout Randomization
- ASM—Algorithmic State Machine
- ASMP—Asymmetric Multiprocessing
- ASN.1—Abstract Syntax Notation 1
- ASP—Active Server Pages
- ASP—Application Service Provider
- ASR—Asynchronous Signal Routine
- AST—Abstract Syntax Tree
- AT—Advanced Technology
- AT—Access Time
- AT—Active Terminator
- ATA—Advanced Technology Attachment
- ATAG—Authoring Tool Accessibility Guidelines
- ATAPI—Advanced Technology Attachment Packet Interface
- ATM—Asynchronous Transfer Mode
- ATT&CK—Adversarial Tactics, Techniques, and Common Knowledge
- AUP—Acceptable use policy
- AuthIP—Authenticated Internet Protocol
- AuthN—Authentication
- AuthZ—Authorization
- AV—Antivirus software
- AVC—Advanced Video Coding
- AVI—Audio Video Interleaved
- AWK—Aho Weinberger Kernighan
- AWS—Amazon Web Services
- AWT—Abstract Window Toolkit

== B ==
- B2B—Business-to-Business
- B2C—Business-to-Consumer
- B2E—Business-to-Employee
- BaaS—Backend as a service
- BaaS—Banking as a service
- BaaS—Blockchain as a service
- BAL—Basic Assembly Language
- BAM—Block Availability Map
- BAN—Body area network
- BAS—Building automation systems
- Bash—Bourne-again shell
- BASIC—Beginner's All-Purpose Symbolic Instruction Code
- BBP—Baseband ProcessorCo
- BBS—Bulletin Board System
- BC—Business Continuity
- BCC—Blind Carbon Copy
- BCD—Binary Coded Decimal
- BCD—Boot Configuration Data
- BCNF—Boyce–Codd normal form
- BCP—Best Current Practice
- BCP—Business continuity planning
- BCS—British Computer Society
- BE—Backend
- BEEP—Blocks Extensible Exchange Protocol
- BER—Basic Encoding Rules
- BER—Bit Error Rate
- BFD—Bidirectional Forwarding Detection
- BFD—Binary File Descriptor
- BFS—Breadth-First Search
- BFT—Byzantine Fault Tolerant
- BGP—Border Gateway Protocol
- BI—Business Intelligence
- BIA—Business impact analysis
- BiDi—Bi-Directional
- bin—binary
- BINAC—Binary Automatic Computer
- BIND—Berkeley Internet Name Domain
- BIOS—Basic Input Output System
- BJT—Bipolar Junction Transistor
- bit—binary digit
- BLISS—Bimodal Lattice Signature Scheme
- Blob—Binary large object
- Blog—Web Log
- BMP—Basic Multilingual Plane
- BNC—Baby Neill Constant
- BOINC—Berkeley Open Infrastructure for Network Computing
- BOM—Byte Order Mark
- BOOTP—Bootstrap Protocol
- BPA—Oracle Business Process Analysis (BPA) Suite
- BPDU—Bridge Protocol Data Units
- BPEL—Business Process Execution Language
- BPL—Broadband over Power Lines
- BPM—Business Process Management
- BPM—Business Process Modeling
- bps—bits per second
- BRM—Business Reference Model
- BRMS—Business Rule Management System
- BRR—Business Readiness Rating
- BRS—Broadband Radio Service
- BSA—Business Software Alliance
- BSB—Backside Bus
- BSD—Berkeley Software Distribution
- BSoD—Blue Screen of Death
- BSS—Block Started by Symbol
- BT—BitTorrent
- BT—Bluetooth
- B TAM—Basic Telecommunications Access Method
- BURS—Bottom-up rewrite system
- BW—Bandwidth
- BYOD—Bring Your Own Device
- Byte—By eight (group of 8 bits)

== C ==
- CA—Certificate authority
- CA—Computer Associates International, Inc.
- CaaS—Content as a service
- CAD—Computer-aided design
- CAE—Computer-aided engineering
- CAID—Computer-aided industrial design
- CAI—Computer-aided instruction
- CAM—Computer-aided manufacturing
- CAN—Campus network
- CAP—Consistency availability partition tolerance (theorem)
- CAPA—Corrective and preventive actiont
- CAPI—Cryptographic Application Programming Interface
- CAPTCHA—Completely automated public Turing test to tell computers and humans apart
- CAQ—Computer-aided quality assurance
- CARP—Cache Array Routing Protocol
- CARP—Common Address Redundancy Protocol
- CASB—Cloud access security broker
- CASE—Computer-aided software engineering
- CAT—Computer-aided translation
- Cat—Category rating
- CBC—Cipher block chaining
- CBC-MAC—Cipher block chaining message authentication code
- CBPRNG—Counter-based pseudo-random number generator
- CBRNG—Counter-based random number generator
- cc—C compiler
- CC—Carbon copy
- CC—Creative Commons
- CCE—Common Configuration Enumeration
- CCM—Central control module
- CCM—Cloud Controls Matrix
- CCM—Combined Cipher Machine
- CCMP—CCM mode Protocol
- CCTV—Closed-circuit television
- CCX—Cisco Compatible eXtensions
- CD—Compact Disc
- CDE—Common Desktop Environment
- CDMA—Code-division multiple access
- CDN—Content delivery network
- CDP—Cisco Discovery Protocol
- CDP—Continuous data protection
- CD-R—CD-Recordable
- CD-ROM—CD Read-Only Memory
- CD-RW—CD-Rewritable
- CDSA—Common Data Security Architecture
- CEI—Comparably efficient interconnection
- CER—Canonical Encoding Rules
- CERT—Computer emergency response team
- CES—Consumer Electronics Show
- CF—Compact Flash
- CFB—Cipher feedback
- CFD—Computational fluid dynamics
- CFF—Compact Font Format
- CFG—Context-free grammar
- CFG—Control-flow graph
- CG—Computer graphics
- CGA—Color graphics array
- CGI—Common Gateway Interface
- CGI—Computer-generated imagery
- CGT—Computational Graph Theory
- CHAP—Challenge-Handshake Authentication Protocol
- CHRP—Common Hardware Reference Platform
- CHS—Cylinder–head–sector
- CI/CD—Continuous integration (CI) and continuous delivery (CD)
- CICS—Customer Information Control System
- CIDR—Classless inter-domain routing
- CIFS—Common Internet Filesystem
- CIM—Common Information Model
- CIO—Chief information officer
- CIP—Critical infrastructure protection
- CIR—Committed information rate
- CIS—Center for Internet Security
- CIS—Centre for Internet and Society (India)
- CIS—Computer and information science
- CIS—Comodo Internet Security
- CIS—Contact image sensor
- CIS—Continuous ink system
- CISA—Cybersecurity and Infrastructure Security Agency
- CISC—Complex-instruction-set computer
- CISO—Chief information security officer
- CIT—Center for Information Technology
- CIT—Computer Information Technology
- CJK—Chinese, Japanese, and Korean
- CJKV—Chinese, Japanese, Korean, and Vietnamese
- CLI—Command line interface
- CLR—Common Language Runtime
- CM—Configuration management
- CM—Content management
- CMDB—Configuration management database
- CMM—Capability Maturity Model
- CMMI—Capability Maturity Model Integration
- CMOS—Complementary metal–oxide–semiconductor
- CMS—Content management system
- CN—Canonical Name
- CN—Common Name
- CNC—Computerized numerical control
- CNG—Cryptographic Next Generation
- CNR—Communications and Networking Riser
- CNRI—Corporation for National Research Initiatives
- Coax—Coaxial cabling
- COBOL—Common Business-Oriented Language
- COM—Component Object Model or communication
- ConfigMgr—Microsoft Configuration Manager
- COOP—Continuity of Operations
- COPE—Corporate-owned, personally enabled
- CORBA—Common Object Request Broker Architecture
- CORS—Cross-origin resource sharing
- COTS—Commercial off-the-shelf
- CPA—Cell processor architecture
- CPAN—Comprehensive Perl Archive Network
- CP/CMS—Control Program/Cambridge Monitor System
- CPF—Control Program Facility
- CP/M—Control Program/Monitor
- CPRI—Common Public Radio Interface
- CPS—Characters per second
- CPU—Central processing unit
- CQS—Command–query separation
- CQRS—Command Query Responsibility Segregation
- CR—Carriage return
- CRAN—Comprehensive R Archive Network
- CRC—Cyclic redundancy check
- CRL—Certificate revocation list
- CRLF—Carriage return line feed
- CRM—Customer Relationship Management
- CRS—Computer Reservations System
- CRT—Cathode-ray tube
- CRUD—Create, read, update, and delete
- CS—Cable Select
- CS—Computer science
- CSA—Cloud Security Alliance
- CSE—Computer science and engineering
- CSF—Cybersecurity Framework
- CSi—CompuServe
- CSI—Common System Interface
- CSM—Compatibility support module
- CSMA/CD—Carrier-sense multiple access with collision detection
- CSO—Chief security officer
- CSP—Cloud service provider
- CSP—Communicating sequential processes
- CSP—Cryptographic Service Provider
- CSPRNG—Cryptographically secure pseudorandom number generator
- CSR—Certificate signing request
- CSRF—Cross-site request forgery
- CSS—Cascading style sheets
- CSS—Content-scrambling system
- CSS—Closed-source software
- CSU—Channel service unit
- CSV—Comma-separated values
- CT—Computerized tomography
- cTAKES—clinical Text Analysis and Knowledge Extraction System
- CTAN—Comprehensive TeX Archive Network
- CTCP—Client-to-client protocol
- CTI—Computer telephony integration
- CTFE—Compile-time function execution
- CTL—Computation tree logic
- CTM—Close To Metal
- CTR—Counter mode
- CTS—Clear to send
- CTSS—Compatible Time-Sharing System
- CUA—Common User Access
- C-V2X—Cellular V2X
- CVC—Card Verifiable Certificate
- CVE—Common Vulnerabilities and Exposures
- CVS—Concurrent Versions System
- CVSS—Common Vulnerability Scoring System
- CX—Customer experience

== D ==
- DAC—Digital-to-analog converter
- DAC—Discretionary access control
- DAL—Database Abstraction Layer
- DAO—Data Access Object
- DAO—Data Access Objects
- DAO—Disk-At-Once
- DAP—Directory Access Protocol
- DARPA—Defense Advanced Research Projects Agency
- DAS—Direct Attached Storage
- DAT—Digital Audio Tape
- DB—Database
- DSKT—DesktopDRM
- DBA—Database AdministratorDV
- DBCS—Double Byte Character Set
- DBMS—Database Management System
- DCC—Direct Client-to-Client
- DCCP—Datagram Congestion Control Protocol
- DCCA—Debian Common Core Alliance
- DCL—Data Control Language
- DCS—Distributed Control System
- DCMI—Dublin Core Metadata Initiative
- DCOM—Distributed Component Object Model
- DD—Double Density
- DDE—Dynamic Data Exchange
- DDL—Data Definition Language
- DDoS—Distributed Denial of Service
- DE—Desktop environment
- DDR—Double Data Rate
- DEC—Digital Equipment Corporation
- DEP—Data Execution Prevention
- DER—Distinguished Encoding Rules
- DES—Data Encryption Standard
- dev—development
- DFA—Deterministic Finite Automaton
- DFD—Data-Flow Diagram
- DFS—Depth-First Search
- DFS—Distributed File System
- DGD—Dworkin's Game Driver
- DH—Diffie–Hellman
- DHCP—Dynamic Host Configuration Protocol
- DHTML—Dynamic Hypertext Markup Language
- DIF—Data Integrity Field
- DIMM—Dual Inline Memory Module
- DIN—Deutsches Institut für Normung
- DIP—Dual In-line Package
- DIP—Dependency inversion principle (in the context of SOLID principles)
- DISM—Deployment Image and Service Management Tool
- DIVX—Digital Video Express
- DKIM—DomainKeys Identified Mail
- DL—Download
- DLL—Dynamic-link library
- DLNA—Digital Living Network Alliance
- DLP—Data loss prevention
- DMA—Direct Memory Access
- DMARC—Domain-based Message Authentication, Reporting and Conformance
- DMCA—Digital Millennium Copyright Act
- DMI—Direct Media Interface
- DML—Data Manipulation Language
- DML—Definitive Media Library
- DMR—Dennis M. Ritchie
- DMZ—Demilitarized Zone
- DN—Distinguished Name
- DNAT—Destination network address translation
- DND—Drag-and-Drop
- DNP3—Distributed Network Protocol 3
- DNS—Domain Name System
- DNSBL—Domain Name System blocklist
- DNSSEC—Domain Name System Security Extensions
- DOA—Dead on Arrival
- DOCSIS—Data Over Cable Service Interface Specification
- DoH—DNS over HTTPS
- DOM—Document Object Model
- DORA—Discover, Offer, Request, Acknowledge
- DoS—Denial of Service
- DOS—Disk Operating System
- DoT—DNS over TLS
- DP—Dot Pitch
- DPC—Deferred Procedure Call
- DPI—Deep packet inspection
- DPI—Dots per inch
- DPMI—DOS Protected Mode Interface
- DPMS—Display Power Management Signaling
- DPO—Data Protection Officer or Data Privacy Officer
- DR—Disaster Recovery
- DRAM—Dynamic Random-Access Memory
- DRBG—Deterministic random bit generator
- DR-DOS—Digital Research – Disk Operating System
- DRI—Direct Rendering Infrastructure
- DRM—Digital rights management
- DRM—Direct rendering manager
- DROWN—Decrypting RSA with Obsolete and Weakened eNcryption
- DRP—Disaster recovery plan
- DSA—Digital Signature Algorithm
- DSCP—Differentiated services code point
- DSDL—Document Schema Definition Languages
- DSDM—Dynamic Systems Development Method
- DSL—Digital Subscriber Line
- DSL—Domain-Specific Language
- DSLAM—Digital Subscriber Line Access Multiplexer
- DSMLT—Distributed split multi-link trunking
- DSN—Database Source Name
- DSN—Data Set Name
- DSP—Digital Signal Processor
- DSRC—Dedicated short-range communications
- DSS—Digital Signature Standard
- DSSS—Direct-sequence spread spectrum
- DSSSL—Document Style Semantics and Specification Language
- DTD—Document Type Definition
- DTE—Data Terminal Equipment or data transfer rate
- DTLS—Datagram Transport Layer Security
- DTO—Data Transfer Object
- DTP—Desktop Publishing
- DTR—Data Terminal Ready or Data transfer rate
- DTSTTCPW—"do the simplest thing that could possibly work"
- Dual_EC_DRBG—Dual Elliptic Curve Deterministic Random Bit Generator
- DV—Domain-validated certificate
- DVD—Digital Versatile Disc or Digital Video Disc
- DVD-R—DVD-Recordable
- DVD-ROM—DVD-Read-Only Memory
- DVD-RW—DVD-Rewritable
- DVI—Digital Visual Interface
- DVR—Digital Video Recorder
- DW—Data Warehouse
- DXVA—DirectX Video Acceleration

== E ==
- EAAF—Enterprise Architecture Assessment Framework
- EAI—Enterprise Application Integration
- EAP—Extensible Authentication Protocol
- EAP-AKA—EAP Authentication and Key Agreement
- EAP-AKA'—EAP Authentication and Key Agreement prime
- EAP-EKE—EAP Encrypted Key Exchange
- EAP-FAST—EAP Flexible Authentication via Secure Tunneling
- EAP-GTC—EAP Generic Token Card
- EAP-IKEv2—EAP Internet Key Exchange v. 2
- EAP-MD5—EAP Message Digest 5
- EAP-NOOB—Nimble out-of-band authentication for EAP
- EAP-POTP—EAP Protected One-Time Password
- EAP-PSK—EAP Pre-Shared Key
- EAP-PWD—EAP Password
- EAP-SIM—EAP Subscriber Identity Module
- EAP-TLS—EAP Transport Layer Security
- EAP-TTLS—EAP Tunneled Transport Layer Security
- EAS—Exchange ActiveSync
- EBCDIC—Extended Binary Coded Decimal Interchange Code
- EBML—Extensible Binary Meta Language
- EBS—Elastic Block Store
- ebXML—Electronic Business using eXtensible Markup Language
- EC2—Elastic Compute Cloud
- ECB—Electronic codebook
- ECC—Elliptic-curve cryptography
- ECDH—Elliptic-curve Diffie–Hellman
- ECDHE—Elliptic-curve Diffie–Hellman Ephemeral
- ECDSA—Elliptic Curve Digital Signature Algorithm
- ECMA—European Computer Manufacturers Association
- ECN—Explicit Congestion Notification
- ECOS—Embedded Configurable Operating System
- ECRS—Expense and Cost Recovery System
- ECS—Entity-Component-System
- ECU—Electronic control unit
- EDA—Electronic Design Automation
- EDGE—Enhanced Data rates for GSM Evolution
- EDI—Electronic Data Interchange
- EDO—Extended Data Out
- EDR—Endpoint detection and response
- EDSAC—Electronic Delay Storage Automatic Calculator
- EDVAC—Electronic Discrete Variable Automatic Computer
- EEPROM—Electronically Erasable Programmable Read-Only Memory
- EF—Exposure factor
- EFF—Electronic Frontier Foundation
- EFI—Extensible Firmware Interface
- EFM—Eight-to-Fourteen Modulation
- EFM—Ethernet in the first mile
- EFS—Encrypting File System
- EGA—Enhanced Graphics Array
- E-mail—Electronic mail
- EGP—Exterior Gateway Protocol
- eID—electronic ID card
- EIDE—Enhanced IDE
- EIGRP—Enhanced Interior Gateway Routing Protocol
- EISA—Extended Industry Standard Architecture
- EJBCA—Enterprise JavaBeans Certificate Authority
- EKE—Encrypted key exchange
- ELF—Extremely Low Frequency
- ELF—Executable and Linkable Format
- ELM—ELectronic Mail
- EMACS—Editor MACroS
- EMCC—Eckert–Mauchly Computer Corporation
- EMI—Electromagnetic interference
- EMM—Enterprise mobility management
- EMS—Expanded Memory Specification
- ENIAC—Electronic Numerical Integrator And Computer
- EOF—End of File
- EOL—End of Life
- EOL—End of Line
- EOM—End of Message
- EOS—End of Support
- EPC—Electronic Product Code
- EPC—Evolved Packet Core
- EPIC—Explicitly Parallel Instruction Computing
- EPP—Endpoint protection platform
- EPROM—Erasable Programmable Read-Only Memory
- ERD—Entity–Relationship Diagram
- ERGS—Electronic Route Guidance System
- ERM—Entity–Relationship Model
- ERP—Enterprise Resource Planning
- eSATA—external SATA
- ESB—Enterprise service bus
- ESCON—Enterprise Systems Connection
- ESD—Electrostatic Discharge
- ESI—Electronically Stored Information
- ESN—Electronic serial number
- ESP—Encapsulating Security Payload
- ESR—Eric Steven Raymond
- ESS—Extended service set
- ETDR—Endpoint threat detection and response
- ETL—Extract, Transform, Load
- EtM—Encrypt-then-MAC
- E&M—Encrypt-and-MAC
- ETW—Event Tracing for Windows
- EUC—Extended Unix Code
- EULA—End User License Agreement
- EWMH—Extended Window Manager Hints
- EXT—EXTended file system
- ETA—Estimated Time of Arrival
- EV—Extended Validation Certificate

== F ==
- FAP—FORTRAN Assembly Program
- FASM—Flat ASseMbler
- FAST—Flexible Authentication via Secure Tunneling
- FAT—File Allocation Table
- FAQ—Frequently Asked Questions
- FBDIMM—Fully Buffered Dual Inline Memory Module
- FC-AL—Fibre Channel Arbitrated Loop
- FCB—File Control Block
- FCS—Frame Check Sequence
- FDC—Floppy-Disk Controller
- FDD—Frequency-Division Duplexing
- FDD—Floppy Disk Drive
- FDE—Full disk encryption
- FDDI—Fiber Distributed Data Interface
- FDM—Frequency-Division Multiplexing
- FDMA—Frequency-Division Multiple Access
- FDS—Fedora Directory Server
- FE—Frontend
- FEC—Forward Error Correction
- FEMB—Front-End Motherboard
- FET—Field Effect Transistor
- FEXT—Far-end crosstalk
- FHRP—First-hop redundancy protocol
- FHS—Filesystem Hierarchy Standard
- FHSS—Frequency-hopping spread spectrum
- FICON—FIber CONnectivity
- FIFO—First In First Out
- FIM—File integrity monitoring
- FIPS—Federal Information Processing Standards
- FIRST—Forum of Incident Response and Security Teams
- FISMA—Federal Information Security Management Act of 2002
- FL—Function Level
- FLAC—Free Lossless Audio Codec
- FLOPS—FLoating-Point Operations Per Second
- FLOSS—Free/Libre/Open-Source Software
- FMC—Fixed Mobile Convergence "Mobile UC or Unified Communications over Wireless"
- FNV—Fowler–Noll–Vo
- FOLDOC—Free On-line Dictionary of Computing
- FORTRAN—Formula Translation
- FOSDEM—Free and Open-source Software Developers' European Meeting
- FOSI—Formatted Output Specification Instance
- FOSS—Free and Open-Source Software
- FP—Function Programming
- FP—Functional Programming
- FPGA—Field-programmable gate array
- FPS—Floating Point Systems
- FPU—Floating-Point Unit
- FRR—False Rejection Rate
- FRU—Field-Replaceable Unit
- FS—File System
- FS—Forward secrecy
- FSB—Front-Side Bus
- fsck—File System Check
- FSF—Free Software Foundation
- FSM—Finite State Machine
- FTP—File Transfer Protocol
- FTPS—FTP-SSL or FTP Secure
- FTTC—Fiber To The Curb
- FTTH—Fiber To The Home
- FTTP—Fiber To The Premises
- FQDN—Fully Qualified Domain Name
- FUD—Fear Uncertainty Doubt
- FWS—Folding White Space
- FXP—File eXchange Protocol
- FYI—For Your Information

== G ==
- G11N—Globalization
- GADS—Gateway Algorithms and Data Structures
- Gas—GNU Assembler
- Gb—Gigabit
- GB—Gigabyte
- Gbps—Gigabits per second
- GC—Garbage collection
- GCC—GNU Compiler Collection
- GCJ—GNU Compiler for Java
- GCM—Galois/Counter Mode
- GCP—Google Cloud Platform
- GCR—Group Coded Recording
- GDB—GNU Debugger
- GDI—Graphics Device Interface
- GDPR—General Data Protection Regulation
- GEM—Graphics Environment Manager
- GFDL—GNU Free Documentation License
- GIF—Graphics Interchange Format
- GIGO—Garbage In, Garbage Out
- GIMP—GNU Image Manipulation Program
- GIMPS—Great Internet Mersenne Prime Search
- GIS—Geographic Information System
- GLBP—Gateway Load Balancing Protocol
- GLUT—OpenGL Utility Toolkit
- GML—Geography Markup Language
- GNOME—GNU Network Object Model Environment
- GNU—GNU's Not Unix
- GnuPG or GNU—GNU Privacy Guard
- GnuTLS—GNU Transport Layer Security
- GOMS—Goals, Operators, Methods, and Selection rules
- GPASM—GNU PIC ASseMbler
- GPFS—General Parallel File System
- GPG—GNU Privacy Guard
- GPGPU—General-Purpose Computing on Graphics Processing Units
- GPIB—General-Purpose Instrumentation Bus
- GPL—General Public License
- GPL—General-Purpose Language
- GPO—Group Policy Object
- GPRS—General Packet Radio Service
- GPT—GUID Partition Table
- GPU—Graphics Processing Unit
- GRASP—General Responsibility Assignment Software Patterns
- GRE—Generic routing encapsulation
- GRUB—Grand Unified Boot-Loader
- GERAN—GSM EDGE Radio Access Network
- GSM—Global System for Mobile Communications
- GTC—Generic Token Card
- GTK/GTK+—GIMP Toolkit
- GUI—Graphical user interface
- GUID—Globally Unique IDentifier
- GWT—Google Web Toolkit

== H ==
- HA—High availability
- HAL—Hardware Abstraction Layer
- HAN—Home network
- HASP—Houston Automatic Spooling Priority
- HBA—Host Bus Adapter
- HCI—Human—Computer Interaction
- HD—High Density
- HDD—Hard Disk Drive
- HCL—Hardware Compatibility List
- HD DVD—High Definition DVD
- HDL—Hardware Description Language
- HDMI—High-Definition Multimedia Interface
- HECI—Host Embedded Controller Interface
- HF—High Frequency
- HFS—Hierarchical File System
- HHD—Hybrid Hard Drive
- HID—Human Interface Device
- HIDS—Host-based intrusion detection system
- HIG—Human Interface Guidelines
- HIPS—Host-based intrusion prevention system
- HIRD—Hurd of Interfaces Representing Depth
- HLASM—High Level ASseMbler
- HLR—Home location register
- HLS—HTTP Live Streaming
- HMA—High Memory Area
- HMAC—Hash-based message authentication code
- HMI—Human–machine interface
- HOTP—HMAC-based one-time password
- HP—Hewlett-Packard
- HPC—High-Performance Computing
- HPFS—High Performance File System
- HSDPA—High-Speed Downlink Packet Access
- HSRP—Hot Standby Router Protocol
- HTC—High-Throughput Computing
- HSM—Hardware security module
- HSM—Hierarchical storage management
- HT—Hyper Threading
- HTM—Hierarchical Temporal Memory
- HTML—Hypertext Markup Language
- HTTP—Hypertext Transfer Protocol
- HTTPd—Hypertext Transport Protocol Daemon
- HTTPS—HTTP Secure
- HTX—HyperTransport eXpansion
- HURD—Hird of Unix-Replacing Daemons
- HVD—Holographic Versatile Disc
- Hz—Hertz

== I ==
- I²C—Inter-Integrated Circuit
- I²S—Integrated Interchip Sound
- I18N—Internationalization
- IaaS—Infrastructure as a Service
- IAB—Internet Architecture Board
- IaC—Infrastructure as Code
- IAM—Identity and access management
- IANA—Internet Assigned Numbers Authority
- iBCS—Intel Binary Compatibility Standard
- IBM—International Business Machines
- IBSS—Independent basic service set
- IC—Integrated Circuit
- ICANN—Internet Corporation for Assigned Names and Numbers
- ICE—In-Circuit Emulator
- ICE—Intrusion Countermeasure Electronics
- ICH—I/O Controller Hub
- ICL—International Computers Limited
- ICMP—Internet Control Message Protocol
- ICP—Internet Cache Protocol
- ICS—Industrial control system
- ICS—Internet Connection Sharing
- ICT—Information and Communication Technology
- IDE—Integrated Development Environment
- IDE—Integrated Drive Electronics
- IDEA—International Data Encryption Algorithm
- IDF—Intermediate Data Format
- IDF—Intermediate Distribution Frame
- IDL—Interactive Data Language
- IDL—Interface Definition Language
- IDN—Internationalized domain name
- IdP—Identity provider (cybersecurity)
- IDPS—Intrusion detection and prevention system
- IDS—Intrusion Detection System
- IE—Internet Explorer
- IEC—International Electrotechnical Commission
- IED—Intelligent electronic device
- IEEE—Institute of Electrical and Electronics Engineers
- IEN—Internet Experiment Note
- IETF—Internet Engineering Task Force
- IFL—Integrated Facility for Linux
- IGMP—Internet Group Management Protocol
- IGRP—Interior Gateway Routing Protocol
- IHV—Independent Hardware Vendor
- IIOP—Internet Inter-Orb Protocol
- IIoT—Industrial internet of things
- IIS—Internet Information Services
- IKE—Internet Key Exchange
- IL—Intermediate Language
- IM—Instant Message or Instant Messaging
- IMAP—Internet Message Access Protocol
- IME—Input Method Editor
- INN—InterNetNews
- INFOSEC—Information Systems Security
- I/O—Input/output
- IoC—Indicator of compromise
- IoC—Inversion of control
- IOPS—Input/output operations per second
- IoT—Internet of things
- IP—Intellectual Property
- IP—Internet Protocol
- IPAM—IP Address Management
- IPC—Inter-Process Communication
- IPL—Initial Program Load
- IPMI—Intelligent Platform Management Interface
- IPO—Inter Procedural Optimization
- IPP—Internet Printing Protocol
- IPS—In-Plane Switching
- IPS—Instructions Per Second
- IPS—Intrusion Prevention System
- IPSJ—Information Processing Society of Japan
- IPsec—Internet Protocol Security
- IPTV—Internet Protocol Television
- IPv4—Internet Protocol version 4
- IPv6—Internet Protocol version 6
- IPX—Internetwork Packet Exchange
- IR—Intermediate representation
- IRC—Internet Relay Chat
- IrDA—Infrared Data Association
- IRE—Institute of Radio Engineers
- IRI—Internationalized Resource Identifier
- IRP—I/O Request Packet
- IRQ—Interrupt Request
- IRT—Incident response team
- IS—Information Systems
- IS-IS—Intermediate System to Intermediate System
- ISA—Industry Standard Architecture
- ISA—Instruction Set Architecture
- ISAC—Information Sharing and Analysis Center
- ISAKMP—Internet Security Association and Key Management Protocol
- ISAM—Indexed Sequential Access Method
- ISAP—Information Security Automation Program
- ISATAP—Intra-Site Automatic Tunnel Addressing Protocol
- ISC—Internet Storm Center
- iSCSI—Internet Small Computer System Interface
- ISDN—Integrated Services Digital Network
- ISO—International Organization for Standardization
- ISOC—Information security operations center
- ISOC—Internet Society
- iSNS—Internet Storage Name Service
- ISP—Internet Service Provider
- ISP—Interface segregation principle (in the context of SOLID principles)
- ISPF—Interactive System Productivity Facility
- ISR—Interrupt Service Routine
- ISRG—Internet Security Research Group
- ISSA—Information Systems Security Association
- IST—InterSwitch Trunk
- ISV—Independent Software Vendor
- IT—Information Technology
- ITIL—Information Technology Infrastructure Library
- ITL—Interval Temporal Logic
- ITS—Intelligent transportation system
- ITU—International Telecommunication Union
- ITU-T—International Telecommunication Union Telecommunication Standardization Sector
- IV—Initialization vector
- IVR(S)—Interactive Voice Response (System)

== J ==
- J2EE—Java 2 Enterprise Edition
- J2ME—Java 2 Micro Edition
- J2SE—Java 2 Standard Edition
- JAAS—Java Authentication and Authorization Service
- JATS—Journal Article Tag Suite
- JAXB—Java Architecture for XML Binding
- JAX-RPC—Jakarta XML (formerly Java XML) for Remote Procedure Calls
- JAXP—Java API for XML Processing
- JBOD—Just a Bunch of Disks
- JCE— Java Cryptography Extension
- JCL—Job Control Language
- JCP—Java Community Process
- JDBC—Java Database Connectivity
- JDK—Java Development Kit
- JEE—Java Enterprise Edition
- JES—Job Entry Subsystem
- JDS—Java Desktop System
- JFC—Java Foundation Classes
- JFET—Junction Field-Effect Transistor
- JFS—IBM Journaling File System
- JINI—Jini Is Not Initials
- JIT—Just-In-Time
- JME—Java Micro Edition
- JMX—Java Management Extensions
- JMS—Java Message Service
- JNDI—Java Naming and Directory Interface
- JNI—Java Native Interface
- JNZ—Jump non-zero
- JPEG—Joint Photographic Experts Group
- JRE—Java Runtime Environment
- JS—JavaScript
- JSE—Java Standard Edition
- JSON—JavaScript Object Notation
- JSP—Jackson Structured Programming
- JSP—JavaServer Pages
- JTAG—Joint Test Action Group
- JVM—Java Virtual Machine
- JWE—JSON Web Encryption
- JWS—JSON Web Signature
- JWT—JSON Web Token

== K ==
- K&R—Kernighan and Ritchie
- K8s—Kubernetes
- Kb—Kilobit
- KB—Keyboard
- KB—Kilobyte
- KB—Knowledge Base
- Kbps—Kilobits per second
- KC—Keyboard computer
- KDC—Key distribution center
- KDE—K Desktop Environment
- KDF—Key derivation function
- KEK—Key encryption key
- kHz—Kilohertz
- KiB—Kibibyte
- KINK—Kerberized Internet Negotiation of Keys
- KML—Keyhole Markup Language
- KMS—Kernal Mode Setting
- KMS—Key Management Server
- KMS—Knowledge Management System
- KPOP—Kerberized Post Office Protocol
- KRACK—Key Reinstallation Attack
- KPK—Key production key
- KRL—Knowledge Representation Language
- KVM—Keyboard, Video, Mouse

== L ==
- L10N—Localization
- L2TP—Layer 2 Tunneling Protocol
- LACP—Link Aggregation Control Protocol
- LAMP—Linux Apache MySQL Perl
- LAMP—Linux Apache MySQL PHP
- LAMP—Linux Apache MySQL Python
- LAN—Local Area Network
- LATA—Local Access and Transport Area
- LBA—Logical Block Addressing
- LB—Load Balancer
- LBAC—Lattice-based access control
- LCD—Liquid Crystal Display
- LCDP—Low-code development platform
- LCOS—Liquid Crystal On Silicon
- LCR—Least Cost Routing
- LDAP—Lightweight Directory Access Protocol
- LDIF—LDAP Data Interchange Format
- LE—Logical Extents
- LEAP—Lightweight Extensible Authentication Protocol
- LED—Light-emitting diode
- LF—Line Feed
- LF—Low Frequency
- LFI—Local file inclusion
- LFS—Linux From Scratch
- LGA—Land Grid Array
- LGPL—Lesser General Public License
- LIB—LIBrary
- LIF—Low Insertion Force
- LIFO—Last In First Out
- LILO—Linux Loader
- LISP—LISt Processing
- LKML—Linux Kernel Mailing List
- LLC—Logical link control
- LM—Lan Manager
- LOC—Lines of Code
- LPC—Lars Pensjö C
- LPI—Linux Professional Institute
- LPT— Line Print Terminal
- LRU—Least Recently Used
- LSB—Least Significant Bit
- LSB—Linux Standard Base
- LSI—Large-Scale Integration
- LSP—Liskov substitution principle
- LTE—Long-Term Evolution
- LTL—Linear Temporal Logic
- LTR—Left-to-Right
- LTS—Long-term support
- LUG—Linux User Group
- LUN—Logical Unit Number
- LV—Logical Volume
- LVD—Low Voltage Differential
- LVM—Logical Volume Management
- LZW—Lempel-Ziv-Welch

== M ==
- MaaS—Mobility as a service
- MaaS—Monitoring as a service
- MAAWG—Messaging Anti-Abuse Working Group
- MAC—Mandatory access control
- MAC—Medium access control
- MAC—Message authentication code
- MANET—Mobile Ad-Hoc Network
- MAN—Metropolitan Area Network
- MAPI—Messaging Application Programming Interface
- MAPS—Mail Abuse Prevention System
- MAU—Media access unit
- MAU—Medium Attachment Unit
- MAWI—Measurement and Analysis on the WIDE Internet
- Mb—Megabit
- MB—Megabyte
- MBCS—Multi Byte Character Set
- MBD—Model-Based Design
- Mbps—Megabits per second
- MBR—Master Boot Record
- MBSS—Mesh basic service set
- MCA—Micro Channel Architecture
- MCA—Microsoft Certified Architect
- MCAD—Microsoft Certified Application Developer
- MCAS—Microsoft Certified Application Specialist
- MCC or MVCC—Multiversion concurrency control
- MCDBA—Microsoft Certified DataBase Administrator
- MCDST—Microsoft Certified Desktop Support Technician
- MCITP—Microsoft Certified Information Technology Professional
- MCM—Microsoft Certified Master
- MCP—Microsoft Certified Professional
- MCPD—Microsoft Certified Professional Developer
- MCSA—Microsoft Certified Systems Administrator
- MCSD—Microsoft Certified Solution Developer
- MCSE—Microsoft Certified Systems Engineer
- MCT—Microsoft Certified Trainer
- MCTS—Microsoft Certified Technology Specialist
- MD—Message Digest (MD2, MD4, MD5, MD6)
- MDA—Monochrome Display Adapter
- MDA—Mail Delivery Agent
- MDA—Model-Driven Architecture
- MDD/MDSD—Model-Driven (Software) Development
- MDF—Main Distribution Frame
- MDI—Multiple-Document Interface
- MDM—Master data management
- MDM—Mobile device management
- ME—Microsoft Edge
- ME—[Windows] Millennium Edition
- MF—Medium Frequency
- MFA—Multi-factor authentication
- MFC—Microsoft Foundation Classes
- MFD—Multi-function device
- MFJ—Modification of Final Judgment
- MFM—Modified Frequency Modulation
- MFP—Multi-function printer
- MFT—Master File Table
- MGCP—Media Gateway Control Protocol
- MHz—Megahertz
- MIB—Management Information Base
- MIC—Message integrity code
- MICKEY—Mutual Irregular Clocking KEYstream generator
- MICR—Magnetic Ink Character Recognition or Magnetic Ink Character Reader
- MIDI—Musical Instrument Digital Interface
- MIMD—Multiple Instruction, Multiple Data
- MIME—Multipurpose Internet Mail Extensions
- MIMO—Multiple-Input Multiple-Output
- MINIX—MIni-uNIX
- MIPS—Microprocessor without Interlocked Pipeline Stages
- MIPS—Million Instructions Per Second
- MISD—Multiple Instruction, Single Data
- MIS—Management Information Systems
- MIT—Massachusetts Institute of Technology
- ML—Machine Learning
- MLT—Multi-link trunking
- MMC—Microsoft Management Console
- MMC—MultiMediaCard
- MMDS—Mortality Medical Data System
- MMDS—Multichannel Multipoint Distribution Service
- MMF—Multi-Mode (optical) Fiber
- MM fonts—Multiple master fonts
- MMIO—Memory-Mapped I/O
- MMI—Man Machine Interface
- MMF—Multi-mode fiber
- MMORPG—Massively Multiplayer Online Role-Playing Game
- MMS—Multimedia Message Service
- MMU—Memory Management Unit
- MMX—Multi-Media Extensions
- MNG—Multiple-image Network Graphics
- MoBo—Motherboard
- MOM—Message-Oriented Middleware
- MOO—MUD Object Oriented
- MOP—Meta-Object Protocol
- MOSFET—Metal-Oxide Semiconductor Field Effect Transistor
- MOS—Microsoft Office Specialist
- MOTD—Message Of The Day
- MoU—Memorandum of understanding
- MOUS—Microsoft Office User Specialist
- MOV—Apple QuickTime Multimedia File
- MPAA—Motion Picture Association of America
- MPEG—Motion Pictures Experts Group
- MPLS—Multiprotocol Label Switching
- MPL—Mozilla Public License
- MPU—Microprocessor Unit
- MQTT—Message Queues Telemetry Transport
- MS—Memory Stick
- MS—Microsoft
- MSA—Master service agreement
- MSA—Message submission agent
- MSB—Most Significant Bit
- MS-CHAP—Microsoft version of the Challenge-Handshake Authentication Protocol
- MSDN—Microsoft Developer Network
- MS-DOS—Microsoft Disk Operating System
- MSI—Medium-Scale Integration
- MSI—Message Signaled Interrupt
- MSI—Microsoft Installer
- MSMQ—Microsoft Message Queuing
- MSN—Microsoft Network
- MSP—Managed service provider
- MSS—Managed security service
- MSSP—Managed security service provider
- MT—Machine Translation
- MTA—Mail Transfer Agent
- MTA—Microsoft Technology Associate
- MTBF—Mean time between failures
- MtE—MAC-then-Encrypt
- MTS—Michigan Terminal System
- MTTF—Mean time to failure
- MTTR—Mean time to repair
- MTU—Maximum Transmission Unit
- MU—Memory Unit
- MUA—Mail User Agent
- MUD—Multi-User Dungeon
- MVC—Model-View-Controller
- MVP—Most Valuable Professional
- MVS—Multiple Virtual Storage
- MWC—Mobile World Congress
- MWN—Municipal wireless network
- MXF—Material Exchange Format
- MX—Mail exchange

== N ==
- NAC—Network access control
- NACK—Negative ACKnowledgement
- NAIC—National Infrastructure Advisory Council
- NAK—Negative AcKnowledge Character
- NaN—Not a Number
- NAP—Network Access Protection
- NAPT—Network address and port translation
- NAS—Network access server
- NAS—Network-attached storage
- NASL—Nessus Attack Scripting Language
- NASM—Netwide ASseMbler
- NAT—Network address translation
- NAT-T—Network address translator traversal
- NBO—Northbound interface
- NCDP—No-code development platform
- NCP—NetWare Core Protocol
- NCQ—Native Command Queuing
- NCR—National Cash Register
- NCSA—National Center for Supercomputing Applications
- NDIS—Network Driver Interface Specification
- NDP—Neighbor Discovery Protocol
- NDPS—Novell Distributed Print Services
- NDS—Novell Der irectory Services
- NEP—Network Equipment Provider
- NetBIOS—Network Basic Input/Output System
- NetBT—NetBIOS over TCP/IP
- NEXT—Near-end crosstalk
- NFA—Nondeterministic Finite Automaton
- NFC—Near-field communication
- NFS—Network File System
- NGFW—Next-generation firewall
- NGSCB—Next-Generation Secure Computing Base
- NI—National Instruments
- NIC—Network Interface Controller or Network Interface Card
- NIDS—Network intrusion detection systems
- NII—National Information Infrastructure
- NIM—No Internal Message
- NIO—Non-blocking I/O
- NIPS—Network-based intrusion prevention system
- NIST—National Institute of Standards and Technology
- NLE—Non-Linear Editing system
- NLP—Natural Language Processing
- NLS—Native Language Support
- NMI—Non-Maskable Interrupt
- NNRP—Network News Reader Protocol
- NNTP—Network News Transfer Protocol
- NOC—Network Operations Center
- NOOB—Nibble out-of-band authentication
- NOP—No OPeration
- NOS—Network Operating System
- NP—Nondeterministic Polynomial time
- NPL—Netscape Public License
- NPPD—National Protection and Programs Directorate
- NPTL—Native POSIX Thread Library
- NPU—Network Processing Unit
- NS—Netscape
- NSIS—Nullsoft Scriptable Install System
- NSN—Network service name
- NSPR—Netscape Portable Runtime
- NSS—Novell Storage Service
- NSS—Network Security Services
- NSS—Name Service Switch
- NT—New Technology
- NTFS—New Technology File System
- NTLM—New Technology LAN Manager
- NTP—Network Time Protocol
- NUMA—Non-Uniform Memory Access
- NURBS—Non-Uniform Rational B-Spline
- NUT—Network UPS Tools
- NVD—National Vulnerability Database
- NVMe—NVM Express
- NVR—Network Video Recorder
- NVRAM—Non-Volatile Random-Access Memory
- NX—No-execute

== O ==
- OASIS—Organization for the Advancement of Structured Information Standards
- OAS—Oracle Advanced Security
- OAT—Operational Acceptance Testing
- OAuth—Open Authorization
- OBSAI—Open Base Station Architecture Initiative
- OCR—Optical Character Recognition
- OCSP—Online Certificate Status Protocol
- OCP—Open–closed principle
- ODBC—Open Database Connectivity
- OEM—Original Equipment Manufacturer
- OES—Open Enterprise Server
- OFDM—Orthogonal frequency-division multiplexing
- OFTC—Open and Free Technology Community
- OFX—Open Financial eXchange
- OID—Object Identifier
- OKV—Oracle Key Vault
- OLAP—Online Analytical Processing
- OLE—Object Linking and Embedding
- OLED—Organic light-emitting diode
- OLPC—One Laptop per Child
- OLTP—Online Transaction Processing
- OMF—Object Module Format
- OMG—Object Management Group
- OMR—Optical Mark Reader
- OMTP—Open Mobile Terminal Platform
- ONS—Oracle Net Services
- ONT—Optical network terminal
- ooRexx—Open Object Rexx
- OO—Object-Oriented
- OO—OpenOffice
- OOE—Out-of-Order Execution
- OOM—Out Of Memory
- OOo—OpenOffice.org
- OoOE—Out-of-Order Execution
- OOP—Object-Oriented Programming
- OOTB—Out of the box
- OOBE—Out-of-box experience
- OPML—Outline Processor Markup Language
- ORB—Object Request Broker
- ORBS—Open Relay Behavior-modification System
- ORM—Object–Relational Mapping
- OS—Open Source
- OS—Operating System
- OSCON—O'Reilly Open Source CONvention
- OSDN—Open Source Development Network
- OSI—Open Source Initiative
- OSI—Open Systems Interconnection
- OSINT—Open source intelligence
- OSPF—Open Shortest Path First
- OSS—Open Sound System
- OSS—Open-source software
- OSS—Operations Support System
- OSSTMM—Open Source Security Testing Methodology Manual
- OSTG—Open Source Technology Group
- OT—Operational technology
- OTP—One-time password
- OUI—Organizationally Unique Identifier
- OV—Organization validation
- OVAL—Open Vulnerability and Assessment Language
- OWASP—Open Worldwide Application Security Project
- OWE—Opportunistic Wireless Encryption

== P ==
- P2P—Peer-To-Peer
- PaaS—Platform as a Service
- PAC—Proxy auto-config
- PAM—Pluggable Authentication Module
- PAM—Privileged Access Management
- PAN—Personal Area Network
- PAP—Password Authentication Protocol
- PARC—Palo Alto Research Center
- PAPR—Power Architecture Platform Reference
- PAT—Port address translation
- PATA—Parallel ATA
- PBKDF2—Password-Based Key Derivation Function 2
- PBS—Portable Batch System
- PBX—Private branch exchange
- PC—Personal Computer
- pcap—packet capture
- PCB—Printed Circuit Board
- PCB—Process Control Block
- PC DOS—Personal Computer Disc Operating System
- PCI—Peripheral Component Interconnect
- PCI DSS—Payment Card Industry Data Security Standard
- PCIe—PCI Express
- PCI-X—PCI Extended
- PCL—Printer Command Language
- PCMCIA—Personal Computer Memory Card International Association
- PCM—Pulse-Code Modulation
- PCRE—Perl Compatible Regular Expressions
- PD—Public Domain
- PDA—Personal Digital Assistant
- PDF—Portable Document Format
- PDH—Plesiochronous Digital Hierarchy
- PDP—Programmed Data Processor
- PDU—Power distribution unit
- PDU—Protocol data unit
- PE—Physical Extents
- PE—Portable Executable
- PEAP—Protected Extensible Authentication Protocol
- PEM—Privacy-Enhanced Mail
- PERL—Practical Extraction and Reporting Language
- PERMIS—PrivilEge and Role Management Infrastructure Standards
- PES—Proposed Encryption Standard
- PFS—Perfect forward secrecy
- PG—Peripheral Gateway
- PGA—Pin Grid Array
- PGA—Programmable Gate Array
- PGO—Profile-Guided Optimization
- PGP—Pretty Good Privacy
- PHIPA—Personal Health Information Protection Act
- PHP—Hypertext Preprocessor
- PHR—Personal health record
- PHY—Physical layer
- PIC—Peripheral Interface Controller
- PIC—Programmable Interrupt Controller
- PID—Proportional-Integral-Derivative
- PID—Process ID
- PII—Personally identifiable information
- PIM—Personal Information Manager
- PINE—Program for Internet News and Email
- PING—Packet Internet Gopher
- PIO—Programmed Input/Output
- PIPEDA—Personal Information Protection and Electronic Documents Act
- PIR—Public Interest Registry
- PIV—FIPS 201
- Pixel—Picture element
- PKCS—Public Key Cryptography Standards
- PKI—Public Key Infrastructure
- PLC—Power-Line Communication
- PLC—Programmable logic controller
- PLD—Programmable logic device
- PL/I—Programming Language One
- PL/M—Programming Language for Microcomputers
- PL/P—Programming Language for Prime
- PLT—Power-Line Telecommunications
- PMM—POST Memory Manager
- PNAC—Port-based network access control
- PNA—Personal Navigation Assistant
- PNG—Portable Network Graphics
- PnP—Plug-and-Play
- PNRP—Peer Name Resolution Protocol
- POCE—Personally owned, company enabled
- POCO—Plain Old Class Object
- PoE—Power over Ethernet
- POID—Persistent Object Identifier
- POJO—Plain Old Java Object
- POODLE—Padding Oracle On Downgraded Legacy Encryption
- PoP—Point of Presence
- POP3—Post Office Protocol v3
- PoS—Point of Sale
- POSIX—Portable Operating System Interface, formerly IEEE-IX
- POST—Power-On Self Test
- POTP—Protected One-Time Password
- POTS—Plain old telephone service
- PPC—PowerPC
- PPI—Pixels Per Inch
- PPM—Pages Per Minute
- PPP—Point-to-Point Protocol
- PPPoA—PPP over ATM
- PPPoE—PPP over Ethernet
- PPTP—Point-to-Point Tunneling Protocol
- PR—Pull Request
- PReP—PowerPC Reference Platform
- PRNG—Pseudorandom number generator
- PROM—Programmable Read-Only Memory
- PS—PostScript
- PS/2—Personal System/2
- PSA—Professional Services Automation
- PSK—Pre-shared key
- PSM—Platform Specific Model
- PSTN—Public Switched Telephone Network
- PSU—Power Supply Unit
- PSVI—Post-Schema-Validation Infoset
- PTS-DOS—PhysTechSoft – Disk Operating System
- PTZ—Pan–tilt–zoom camera
- PUA—Potentially unwanted application
- PUP—Potentially unwanted program
- PV—Physical volume
- PV—Process variable
- PVG—Physical volume group
- PVR—Personal Video Recorder
- PXE—Preboot Execution Environment
- PXI—PCI eXtensions for Instrumentation
- PRC—Procedure Remote Call

== Q ==
- QA—Quality assurance
- QC—Quality control
- QC—Quick Charge
- QDR—Quad Data Rate
- QEMU—Quick Emulator
- QFP—Quad Flat Package
- QIF—Quicken Interchange Format
- QoS—Quality of Service
- QOTD—Quote of the Day
- QSOP—Quarter-size small-outline package
- Qt—a cross-platform application development framework for creating graphical user interfaces as well as applications that run on various software and hardware platforms
- QTAM—Queued Teleprocessing Access Method

== R ==
- RA—Registration authority
- RAB—Rapid application building
- RACE—Research and Development in Advanced Communications Technologies in Europe
- RACF—Resource Access Control Facility
- RAD—Rapid application development
- RADIUS—Remote Authentication Dial-In User Service
- RAID—Redundant Array of Independent Disks
- RAII—Resource Acquisition Is Initialization
- RAIT—Redundant Array of Inexpensive Tapes
- RAM—Random-access machine
- RAM—Random-access memory
- RAM—Reliability, Availability, and Maintainability
- RAN—Radio access network
- RARP—Reverse Address Resolution Protocol
- RAS—Reliability, Availability, and Serviceability
- RAS—Remote access service
- RAT—Radio access technology
- RAT—Remote access trojan
- RBAC—Role-based access control
- RC—Region Code
- RC—Release Candidate
- RC—Run Commands
- RC2—Rivest Cipher 2 (a block cipher)
- RC4—Rivest Cipher 4 (a stream cipher)
- RC5—Rivest Cipher 5 (a block cipher)
- RC6—Rivest Cipher 6 (a block cipher)
- RCA—Root Cause Analysis
- RCS—Revision Control System
- RD—Remote Desktop
- rd—remove directory
- RDBMS—Relational Database Management System
- RDC—Remote Desktop Connection
- RDF—Resource Description Framework
- RDM—Relational Data Model
- RDOS—Real-time Disk Operating System
- RDP—Remote Desktop Protocol
- RDS—Remote Desktop Services
- REFAL—Recursive Functions Algorithmic Language
- REST—Representational State Transfer
- regex—Regular Expression
- regexp—Regular Expression
- RF—Radio Frequency
- RFB—Remote FrameBuffer
- RFC—Request For Comments
- RFI—Radio Frequency Interference
- RFI—Remote file inclusion
- RFID—Radio-frequency identification
- RG—Radio Guide
- RGB—Red, Green, Blue
- RHL—Red Hat Linux
- RHEL—Red Hat Enterprise Linux
- REXX—Restructured Extended Executor Language
- RIA—Rich Internet Application
- RIAA—Recording Industry Association of America
- RIP—Raster Image Processor
- RIP—Routing Information Protocol
- RIPE—Réseaux IP Européens
- RIPEMD—RACE Integrity Primitives Evaluation Message Digest
- RIPEMD—RIPE Message Digest
- RIR—Regional Internet registry
- RISC—Reduced Instruction Set Computer
- RISC OS—Reduced Instruction Set Computer Operating System
- RJ—Registered jack
- RJE—Remote Job Entry
- RLE—Run-Length Encoding
- RLL—Run-Length Limited
- rmdir—remove directory
- RMF—Risk Management Framework
- RMI—Remote Method Invocation
- RMS—Richard Matthew Stallman
- ROM—Read-Only Memory
- ROMB—Read-Out Motherboard
- ROM-DOS—Read-Only Memory – Disk Operating System
- RPA—Robotic Process Automation
- RPC—Remote Procedure Call
- RPG—Report Program Generator
- RPM—RPM Package Manager
- RPO—Recovery Point Objective
- RRAS—Routing and Remote Access Service
- RRSIG—Resource record signature
- RSA—Rivest Shamir Adleman
- RSBAC—Rule-set-based access control
- RSI—Repetitive Strain Injury
- R-SMLT—Routed split multi-link trunking
- RSR—Rapid Security Response
- RSS—Radio Service Software
- RSS—Remote service software
- RSS—Rich Site Summary, RDF Site Summary, or Really Simple Syndication
- RST—reStructuredText
- RSTP—Rapid Spanning Tree Protocol
- RSVP—Resource Reservation Protocol
- RTAI—Real-Time Application Interface
- RTBH—Remote Triggered Black Hole Filtering
- RTC—Real-Time Clock
- RTD—Round-trip delay
- RTE—Real-Time Enterprise
- RTEMS—Real-Time Executive for Multiprocessor Systems
- RTF—Rich Text Format
- RTL—Right-to-Left
- RTMP—Real Time Messaging Protocol
- RTO—Recovery Time Objective
- RTOS—Real-Time Operating System
- RTP—Real-time Transport Protocol
- RTS—Ready To Send
- RTSP—Real-Time Streaming Protocol
- RTT—Round-trip time
- RTTI—Run-time Type Information
- RTU—Remote Terminal Unit
- RWD—Responsive Web Design

== S ==
- S3—Simple Storage Service
- SA—Security association
- SaaS—Software as a service
- SAE—Simultaneous Authentication of Equals
- SAE—System architecture evolution
- SASE—Secure access service edge
- SASS—Syntactically Awesome Style Sheets
- SAM—Security Account Manager
- SAML—Security Assertion Markup Language
- SAN—Storage area network
- SAN—Subject Alternative Name
- SAS—Serial attached SCSI
- SASE—Secure access service edge
- SASE—Stand-alone synchronization equipment
- SASL—Simple Authentication and Security Layer
- SATA—Serial AT Attachment
- SAX—Simple API for XML
- SBOD—Spinning Beachball of Death
- SBP-2—Serial Bus Protocol 2
- sbin—superuser binary
- sbs—Small Business Server
- SCADA—Supervisory Control and Data Acquisition
- SCAP—Security Content Automation Protocol
- SCEP—Simple Certificate Enrollment Protocol
- SCCM—System Center Configuration Manager
- SCID—Source code in database
- SCM—Software configuration management
- SCM—Source code management
- SCO—Santa Cruz Operation Inc.
- SCP—Seattle Computer Products
- SCP—Secure copy protocol
- SCRAM—Salted Challenge Response Authentication Mechanism
- SCSI—Small Computer System Interface
- SCTP—Stream Control Transmission Protocol
- SD—Secure Digital
- SDD—Software design description
- SDDC—Software-defined data center
- SDDL—Security Descriptor Definition Language
- SDH—Synchronous Digital Hierarchy
- SDI—Single-document interface
- SDIO—Secure Digital Input Output
- SDK—Software development kit
- SDL—Simple DirectMedia Layer
- SDLC—Software development life cycle
- SDN—Software-defined networking
- SDP—Session Description Protocol
- SDP—Software-defined perimeter
- SDP—Software-defined protection
- SDR—Software-defined radio
- SDRAM—Synchronous dynamic random-access memory
- SDSL—Symmetric digital subscriber line
- SD-WAN—Software-defined wide area network
- SDXF—Structured Data eXchange Format
- SE—Single ended
- SECC—Single-Edged Contact Cartridge
- SED—Self-encrypting drive
- SEH—Structured Exception Handling
- SEI—Software Engineering Institute
- SELinux—Security-Enhanced Linux
- SEO—Search engine optimization
- SFC—Sequential function chart
- SFC—System File Checker
- SFTP—Secure File Transfer Protocol
- SFTP—Simple File Transfer Protocol
- SFTP—SSH File Transfer Protocol
- SGI—Silicon Graphics, Incorporated
- SGML—Standard Generalized Markup Language
- SGR—Select Graphic Rendition
- SGX—Software Guard eXtensions
- SHA—Secure Hash Algorithms
- SHA-1—Secure Hash Algorithm 1
- SHA-2—Secure Hash Algorithm 2
- SHA-3—Secure Hash Algorithm 3
- SHDSL—Single-pair High-speed Digital Subscriber Line
- S-HTTP—Secure Hypertext Transfer Protocol
- SIEM—Security information and event management
- SIGCAT—Special Interest Group on CD-ROM Applications and Technology
- SIGGRAPH—Special Interest Group on Graphics
- SIMD—Single instruction, multiple data
- SIM—Subscriber Identity Module
- SIMM—Single inline memory module
- SIP—Session Initiation Protocol
- SIP—Supplementary Ideographic Plane
- SISD—Single instruction, single data
- SISO—Single-input and single-output
- SLA—Service-level agreement
- SLAAC—Stateless address autoconfiguration
- SLE—Single-loss expectancy
- SLED—SUSE Linux Enterprise Desktop
- SLES—SUSE Linux Enterprise Server
- SLI—Scalable Link Interface
- SLIP—Serial Line Internet Protocol
- SLM—Service Level Management
- SLOC—Source lines of code
- SME—Subject matter expert
- SMF—Single-mode fiber
- SPM—Software project management
- SPMD—Single program, multiple cata
- SPOF—Single point of failure
- SMA—SubMiniature version A
- SMB—Server Message Block
- SMBIOS—System Management BIOS
- SMIL—Synchronized Multimedia Integration Language
- S/MIME—Secure/Multipurpose Internet Mail Extensions
- SMP—Supplementary Multilingual Plane
- SMP—Symmetric multi-processing
- SMPS—Switched-mode power supply
- SMS—Short Message Service
- SMS—System Management Server
- SMT—Simultaneous multithreading
- SMTP—Simple Mail Transfer Protocol
- SMTPS—Simple Mail Transfer Protocol Secure
- SNA—Systems Network Architecture
- SNMP—Simple Network Management Protocol
- SNP—Secure Network Programming
- SNTP—Simple Network Time Protocol
- SOA—Service-oriented architecture
- SOAP—Simple Object Access Protocol
- SOAP—Symbolic Optimal Assembly Program
- SOAR—Security orchestration, automation and response
- SOC—Security operations center
- SOC—System and organization controls
- SoC—System on a chip
- SO-DIMM—Small outline DIMM
- SOE—Standard Operating Environment
- SOHO—Small office/home office
- SOI—Silicon on insulator
- SOLID—Single-responsibility, Open-closed, Liskov substitution, interface segregation, dependency inversion
- SOPA—Stop Online Piracy Act
- SOW—Statement of work
- SP—Service pack
- SPA—Single page application
- SPARC—Scalable Processor Architecture
- SPF—Sender Policy Framework
- SPI—Serial Peripheral Interface
- SPI—Stateful Packet Inspection
- SPICE—Simple Protocol for Independent Computing Environments
- SPIM—Spam over instant messaging
- SPOF—Single point of failure
- SQL—Structured Query Language
- SQLi—SQL injection
- SRAM—Static random-access memory
- SRP—Single-responsibility principle
- SRTP—Secure Real-time Transport Protocol
- SSA—Static Single Assignment
- SSADM—Structured systems analysis and design method
- SSD—Software Specification Document
- SSD—Solid-state drive
- SSDP—Simple Service Discovery Protocol
- SSE—Streaming SIMD Extensions
- SSH—Secure Shell
- SSI—Server Side Includes
- SSI—Single-system image
- SSI—Small-scale integration
- SSID—Service set identifier
- SSL—Secure Sockets Layer
- SSO—Single sign-on
- SSP—Supplementary Special-purpose Plane
- SSRF—Server-side request forgery
- SSSE—Supplementary Streaming SIMD Extensions
- SSSP—Single Source Shortest Path
- SSTC—Security Services Technical Committee
- SSTP—Secure Socket Tunneling Protocol
- STIX—Scientific and Technical Information eXchange
- STOMP—Simple (or Streaming) Text Oriented Messaging Protocol
- STP—Shielded twisted pair
- STP—Spanning Tree Protocol
- STUN—Session Traversal Utilities for NAT
- su—superuser
- SUS—Single UNIX Specification
- SUSE—Software und System-Entwicklung
- SVC—Scalable Video Coding
- SVC—Static VAR compensator
- SVD—Structured VLSI Design
- SVG—Scalable Vector Graphics
- SVGA—Super Video Graphics Array
- SVI—Switch virtual interface
- SVOT—Single version of the truth
- SWF—Shock Wave Flash
- SWG—Secure Web Gateway
- SWT—Standard Widget Toolkit
- Sysop—System operator

== T ==
- TAO—Track-At-Once
- TACACS—Terminal Access Controller Access-Control System
- TAP—Test Access Port
- TAPI—Telephony Application Programming Interface
- TASM—Turbo ASseMbler
- TAXII—Trusted Automated eXchange of Indicator Information
- TB—TeraByte
- Tcl—Tool Command Language
- TCM—The Computer Museum
- TCP—Transmission Control Protocol
- TCP/IP—Transmission Control Protocol/Internet Protocol
- TCSEC—Trusted Computer System Evaluation Criteria
- TCU—Telecommunication Control Unit
- TDE—Transparent data encryption
- TDEA—Triple Data Encryption Algorithm
- TDES—Triple Data Encryption Standard
- TDMA—Time-Division Multiple Access
- TDP—Thermal Design Power
- TEAP—Tunnel Extensible Authentication Protocol
- TEE—Trusted execution environment
- TFT—Thin-Film Transistor
- TFTP—Trivial File Transfer Protocol
- TGS—Ticket Granting Service
- TGT—Ticket Granting Ticket
- THE—The Hessling Editor
- TI—Texas Instruments
- TIFF—Tagged Image File Format
- TIP—Threat Intelligence Platform
- TKIP—Temporal Key Integrity Protocol
- TLA—Three-Letter Acronym
- TLD—Top-Level Domain
- TLS—Thread-Local Storage
- TLS—Transport Layer Security
- TLV—Type—length—value
- TM—Translation memory
- TMM—Testing Maturity Model
- tmp—temporary
- TMS—Translation management system
- TNC—Terminal Node Controller
- TNC—Threaded Neill-Concelman connector
- TOCTOU, TOCTTOU or TOC/TOU—Time-of-check to time-of-use
- TOTP—Time-based one-time password
- TPF—Transaction Processing Facility
- TPM—Trusted Platform Module
- TROFF—Trace Off
- TRON—Trace On
- TRON—The Real-time Operating system Nucleus
- TRSDOS—Tandy Radio Shack – Disk Operating System
- TS—Timestamp
- TSIG—Transaction signature
- TSO—Time Sharing Option
- TSP—Traveling Salesman Problem
- TSR—Terminate and Stay Resident
- TTF—TrueType Font
- TTL—Transistor—Transistor Logic
- TTLS—Tunneled Transport Layer Security
- TTL—Time To Live
- TTP—Tesla Transport Protocol
- TTP—Time-Triggered Protocol
- TTP—Trusted third party
- TTS—Text-to-Speech
- TTY—Teletype
- TUCOWS—The Ultimate Collection of Winsock Software
- TUG—TeX Users Group
- TURN—-Traversal Using Relays around NAT
- Twinax—Twinaxial cabling
- TX-0—Transistorized eXperimental computer zero
- TWAIN—Technology Without An Interesting Name

== U ==
- UAAG—User Agent Accessibility Guidelines
- UAC—User Account Control
- UART—Universal Asynchronous Receiver/Transmitter
- UAS—Unmanned aircraft system
- UAT—User Acceptance Testing
- UAV—Unmanned aerial vehicle
- UB—Undefined Behavior
- UBA—User behavior analytics
- UCS—Universal Character Set
- UDDI—Universal Description, Discovery, and Integration
- UDMA—Ultra DMA
- UDP—User Datagram Protocol
- UEBA—User and entity behavior analytics
- UEFI—Unified Extensible Firmware Interface
- UEM—Unified endpoint management
- UHF—Ultra High Frequency
- UI—User Interface
- UIMA—Unstructured Information Management Architecture
- UL—Upload
- ULA—Uncommitted Logic Array
- ULSI—Ultra Large Scale Integration
- UMA—Upper Memory Area
- UMB—Upper Memory Block
- UML—Unified Modeling Language
- UML—User-Mode Linux
- UMPC—Ultra-Mobile Personal Computer
- UMTS—Universal Mobile Telecommunications System
- UNC—Universal Naming Convention
- UNIVAC—Universal Automatic Computer (By MKS)
- UPS—Uninterruptible Power Supply or Uninterrupted Power Supply
- URI—Uniform Resource Identifier
- URL—Uniform Resource Locator
- URN—Uniform Resource Name
- USB—Universal Serial Bus
- US-CERT—United States Computer Emergency Readiness Team
- usr—User System Resources
- USR—USRobotics
- UTC—Coordinated Universal Time
- UTF—Unicode Transformation Format
- UTM—Unified Threat Management
- UTP—Unshielded twisted pair
- UTRAN—Universal Terrestrial Radio Access Network
- UUCP—Unix to Unix Copy
- UUID—Universally Unique Identifier
- UVC—Universal Virtual Computer
- UWP—Universal Windows Platform
- UX—User Experience

== V ==
- V2X—Vehicle-to-everything
- var—variable
- VaR—Value at risk
- VAX—Virtual Address eXtension
- VB—Visual Basic
- VBA—Visual Basic for Applications
- VBS—Visual Basic Script
- VCPI—Virtual Control Program Interface
- VDC—Virtual data center
- VDE—Virtual Desktop Environment
- VDI—Virtual Desktop Infrastructure
- VDM—Virtual DOS machine
- VDS—Virtual dedicated server
- VDSL—Very High Bitrate Digital Subscriber Line
- VDU—Visual Display Unit
- VDX—Virtual Desktop eXtender
- VEH—Vectored Exception Handling
- VESA—Video Electronics Standards Association
- VFAT—Virtual File Allocation Table
- VFO—Variable-frequency oscillator
- VFS—Virtual File System
- VHD—Virtual Hard Disk
- VG—Volume Group
- VGA—Video Graphics Array
- VHF—Very High Frequency
- VLAN—Virtual Local Area Network
- VLB—Vesa Local Bus
- VLF—Very Low Frequency
- VLIW—Very Long Instruction Word
- VLK—Volume Licensing Key
- VLSI—Very-Large-Scale Integration
- VLSM—Variable-length subnet masking
- VM—Virtual Machine
- VM—Virtual Memory
- VMM—Virtual Machine Monitor
- VNC—Virtual Network Computing
- VOD—Video On Demand
- VoIP—Voice over Internet Protocol
- VoLTE—Voice Over Long-Term Evolution
- VPC—Virtual private cloud
- VPN—Virtual private network
- VPS—Virtual private server
- VPU—Visual Processing Unit
- VR—Virtual Reality
- VRAM—Video Random-Access Memory
- VRML—Virtual Reality Modeling Language
- VRRP—Virtual Router Redundancy Protocol
- VSAM—Virtual Storage-Access Method
- VSAT—Very Small Aperture Terminal
- VT—Video Terminal
- VTAM—Virtual Telecommunications Access Method
- VTL—Virtual tape library
- VUI—Voice user interface

== W ==
- W3C—World Wide Web Consortium
- WAF—Web application firewall
- WAFS—Wide Area File Services
- WAI—Web Accessibility Initiative
- WAIS—Wide Area Information Server
- WAN—Wide Area Network
- WAP—Wireless Access Point
- WAP—Wireless Application Protocol
- WASM—Watcom ASseMbler
- WAVE—Wireless access in vehicular environments
- WBEM—Web-Based Enterprise Management
- WBS—Work breakdown structure
- WCAG—Web Content Accessibility Guidelines
- WCF—Windows Communication Foundation
- WDDM—Windows Display Driver Model
- WDM—Wavelength-Division Multiplexing
- WDM—Windows Driver Model
- WDS—Windows Deployment Services
- WebDAV—WWW Distributed Authoring and Versioning
- WEP—Wired Equivalent Privacy
- WFI—Wait For Interrupt
- WIDE—Widely Integrated Distributed Environment
- WIDS—Wireless intrusion detection system
- WiMAX—Worldwide Interoperability for Microwave Access
- WIMG—Write-Through Access (W), Cache-Inhibited Access (I), Memory Coherence (M), and Guarded (G)
- WIMP—"windows, icons, menus, pointer"
- WinFS—Windows Future Storage
- WinPE—Windows Preinstallation Environment
- WinRE—Windows Recovery Environment
- WinRT—Windows RunTime
- WINS—Windows Internet Name Service
- WIPS—Wireless intrusion prevention system
- WLAN—Wireless Local Area Network
- WMA—Windows Media Audio
- WMI—Windows Management Instrumentation
- WMV—Windows Media Video
- WNS—Windows Push Notification Service
- WOL—Wake-on-LAN
- WOR—Wake-on-Ring
- WORA—Write once, run anywhere
- WORE—Write once, run everywhere
- WORM—Write Once Read Many
- WPA—Wi-Fi Protected Access
- WPAD—Web Proxy Autodiscovery Protocol
- WPAN—Wireless Personal Area Network
- WPF—Windows Presentation Foundation
- WPS—Wi-Fi Protected Setup
- WS—WebSocket
- WS-D—Web Services Dynamic Discovery
- WSDL—Web Services Description Language
- WSFL—Web Services Flow Language
- WSL—Windows Subsystem for Linux
- WTLS—Wireless Transport Layer Security
- WUSB—Wireless Universal Serial Bus
- WWAN—Wireless Wide Area Network
- WWDC—Apple World Wide Developer Conference
- WWID—World Wide Identifier
- WWN—World Wide Name
- WWW—World Wide Web
- WYSIWYG—What You See Is What You Get
- WZC—Wireless Zero Configuration

== X ==
- XACML—eXtensible Access Control Markup Language
- XAML—eXtensible Application Markup Language
- XCBL—XML Common Business Library
- XCCDF—eXtensible Configuration Checklist Description Format
- XDM—X Window Display Manager
- XDMCP—X Display Manager Control Protocol
- XDR—eXtended detection and response
- XHTML—eXtensible Hypertext Markup Language
- XILP—X Interactive ListProc
- XML—eXtensible Markup Language
- XMMS—X Multimedia System
- XMPP—eXtensible Messaging and Presence Protocol
- XMS—eXtended Memory Specification
- XNS—Xerox Network Systems
- XP—Cross-Platform
- XP—eXtreme Programming
- XPCOM—Cross Platform Component Object Model
- XPI—XPInstall
- XPIDL—Cross-Platform IDL
- XPS—XML Paper Specification
- XSD—XML Schema Definition
- XSL—eXtensible Stylesheet Language
- XSL-FO—eXtensible Stylesheet Language Formatting Objects
- XSLT—eXtensible Stylesheet Language Transformations
- XSRF—Cross-site request forgery
- XSS—Cross-Site Scripting
- XT—Crosstalk
- XTACACS—eXtended Terminal Access Controller Access-Control System
- XTF—eXtensible Tag Framework
- XTF—eXtended Triton Format
- XUL—XML User Interface Language
- XVGA—eXtended Video Graphics Adapter

== Y ==
- Y2K—Year Two Thousand
- Y2K38—Year Two Thousand Thirty Eight
- YACC—Yet Another Compiler Compiler
- YAGNI—You Aren't Gonna Need It
- YAML—YAML Ain't Markup Language
- YAML—Yet Another Multicolumn Layout
- YARN—Yet Another Resource Negotiator
- YaST—Yet another Setup Tool

== Z ==
- ZCAV—Zone Constant Angular Velocity
- ZCS—Zero Code Suppression
- ZIF—Zero Insertion Force
- ZIFS—Zero Insertion Force Socket
- ZIP—ZIP file archive
- ZISC—Zero Instruction Set Computer
- ZOI—Zero One Infinity
- ZOPE—Z Object Publishing Environment
- ZMA—Zone Multicast Address
- ZPL—Z-level Programming Language

== See also ==
- Acronym
- Internet slang
- List of file formats
- List of information technology initialisms
