= David W Chadwick =

David Walter Chadwick, born 5 August 1951, is a British computer scientist and academic whose research has focused on information systems security, identity management, public-key infrastructure, access control, authorisation and trust management. He is an emeritus professor of information systems security at the University of Kent, where he was a professor from 2004 until his retirement in 2019. His research has included the development of the PERMIS privilege management infrastructure, W3C Verifiable Credentials, and work on security for distributed and grid computing.

== Early life and education ==
Chadwick was born on 5 August 1951. He attended Rastrick Grammar School before studying chemistry at the University of Salford, where he received a BSc Hons in chemistry in 1972 and a PhD in physical chemistry in 1976.

He later studied management and marketing through the Open University, completing courses including The Effective Manager and Marketing in Action.

== Career ==
Early career

After completing his doctorate, Chadwick worked as a teacher with Voluntary Service Overseas in Ghana from 1976 to 1978. He then worked as a systems programmer and contract programmer before joining the University of Salford's Computing Laboratory in 1980. He held several positions at Salford, including computing officer, senior computing officer, deputy director and acting director of the Centre for Software Research and Development, and general manager of Salford Software Services.

Information security research

Chadwick joined the University of Salford's Information Systems Institute as a senior research fellow in 1988 and later became a senior lecturer and professor of information systems security in 2001. His research focused on information systems security, public-key infrastructure, directory services, authorisation and trust management. He was involved in research projects concerning X.500 and X.509 standards, secure access to medical information, electronic prescriptions and trusted third-party services. A significant part of his research concerned PERMIS, an X.509-based privilege management infrastructure using role-based access control and policy-driven authorisation. His work on PERMIS was later extended to distributed and grid computing and integrated with technologies including Globus Toolkit and Shibboleth.

University of Kent

In December 2004, Chadwick moved to the University of Kent as professor of information systems security. His research there continued to focus on identity management, authorisation, trust management and cloud security, including work on federated authentication and verifiable credentials.

He has served on over 250 programme committees for international conferences and workshops, and chaired several of these. He has reviewed countless papers for journals in computing and information security. He has also contributed to X.500 standards work, authored 2 Internet RFCs 2120 3876, and co-authored the W3C Verifiable Credentials Data Model Recommendations, as well as serving on the EPSRC Security Task Force and Peer Review College.

Verifiable Credentials Ltd

In 2019 Chadwick left the University of Kent to become CEO of the start up company Verifiable Credentials Ltd, an SME jointly owned by Chadwick and the university. The SME sprang out of his research work on PERMIS, as X.509 attribute certificates are a precursor to W3C Verifiable Credentials. The first project the company worked on was to provide experimental COVID 19 certificates, working in conjunction with East Kent Hospitals University NHS Foundation Trust. Verifiable Credentials Ltd was subsequently acquired by Crossword Cyber Security, a much larger SME, where Chadwick worked until his retirement in 2024.

== Publications ==
Chadwick has published over 200 research papers and articles on X.500 directory services, public-key infrastructure, privilege management, authorisation and distributed security. A full list can be found at Google Scholar.

== Awards and Recognition ==
In 2014, Chadwick received a Japan Society for the Promotion of Science Fellowship for research in Japan. In 2015, he received a Royal Academy of Engineering Newton Research Collaboration Programme Award for research on security policy enforcement in federated open-source clouds, in collaboration with the Federal University of Pernambuco in Brazil.

== Personal Life ==
Chadwick has three daughters from his first marriage and one step son from his second. He currently has 6 grand children.

In the forward to his PhD Thesis Chadwick quoted Cat Stephens “But I might die tonight” and Zhuangzi “Life is finite, while knowledge is infinite” indicating that in this short life there are more important issues than undertaking research and pursuing knowledge. Chadwick has always tried to follow the teaching of Jesus Christ, which is “Love your neighbour”. To this end he has worked with refugees for over 20 years, and is currently helping Afghan refugees and the people of Gaza. He is most distressed that despite our great leaps forward in knowledge we still have not learnt how to love our neighbours.
