= SCSA =

SCSA may refer to:

- The California State and Consumer Services Agency
- The VSR V8 Trophy Series, the British version of NASCAR, formerly known as ASCAR, Days of Thunder Series and Stock Car Speed Association (SCSA)
- Secure Content Storage Association, a computing abbreviation
- The School Curriculum and Standards Authority, the authority responsible for regulating curriculum and standards in Western Australian schools
