= Internal representation =

Internal representation may refer to:

- Mental representation, in man
- Knowledge representation, in artificial intelligence
- Intermediate representation, the data structure or code used internally by a compiler or virtual machine to represent source code
