= Xilp =

Xilp may be:

- Xilp (Unix software): a Unix software, X Interactive ListProc
- used from Island Records to label some long-playing records
