= Open Vulnerability and Assessment Language =

International information security community standard

Open Vulnerability and Assessment Language (OVAL) is an international, information security, community standard to promote open and publicly available security content, and to standardize the transfer of this information across the entire spectrum of security tools and services. OVAL includes a language used to encode system details, and an assortment of content repositories held throughout the community. The language standardizes the three main steps of the assessment process:

1. representing configuration information of systems for testing;
2. analyzing the system for the presence of the specified machine state (vulnerability, configuration, patch state, etc.); and
3. reporting the results of this assessment.

The repositories are collections of publicly available and open content that utilize the language.

The OVAL community has developed three schemas written in Extensible Markup Language (XML) to serve as the framework and vocabulary of the OVAL Language. These schemas correspond to the three steps of the assessment process: an OVAL System Characteristics schema for representing system information, an OVAL Definition schema for expressing a specific machine state, and an OVAL Results schema for reporting the results of an assessment.

Content written in the OVAL Language is located in one of the many repositories found within the community. One such repository, known as the OVAL Repository, is hosted by The MITRE Corporation. It is the central meeting place for the OVAL Community to discuss, analyze, store, and disseminate OVAL Definitions. Each definition in the OVAL Repository determines whether a specified software vulnerability, configuration issue, program, or patch is present on a system.

The information security community contributes to the development of OVAL by participating in the creation of the OVAL Language on the OVAL Developers Forum and by writing definitions for the OVAL Repository through the OVAL Community Forum. An OVAL Board consisting of representatives from a broad spectrum of industry, academia, and government organizations from around the world oversees and approves the OVAL Language and monitors the posting of the definitions hosted on the OVAL Web site. This means that the OVAL, which is funded by US-CERT at the U.S. Department of Homeland Security for the benefit of the community, reflects the insights and combined expertise of the broadest possible collection of security and system administration professionals worldwide.

OVAL is used by the Security Content Automation Protocol (SCAP).

== OVAL Language ==
The OVAL Language standardizes the three main steps of the assessment process: representing configuration information of systems for testing; analyzing the system for the presence of the specified machine state (vulnerability, configuration, patch state, etc.); and reporting the results of this assessment.

== OVAL Interpreter ==
The OVAL Interpreter is a freely available reference implementation created to show how data can be collected from a computer for testing based on a set of OVAL Definitions and then evaluated to determine the results of each definition.

The OVAL Interpreter demonstrates the usability of OVAL Definitions, and can be used by definition writers to ensure correct syntax and adherence to the OVAL Language during the development of draft definitions. It is not a fully functional scanning tool and has a simplistic user interface, but running the OVAL Interpreter will provide you with a list of result values for each evaluated definition.

== OVAL Repository ==
The OVAL Repository is the central meeting place for the OVAL Community to discuss, analyze, store, and disseminate OVAL Definitions. Other repositories in the community also host OVAL content, which can include OVAL System Characteristics files and OVAL Results files as well as definitions. The OVAL Repository contains all community-developed OVAL Vulnerability, Compliance, Inventory, and Patch Definitions for supported operating systems. Definitions are free to use and implement in information security products and services. The OVAL Repository Top Contributor Award Program grants awards on a quarterly basis to the top contributors to the OVAL Repository. The Repository is a community effort, and contributions of new content and modifications are instrumental in its success. The awards serve as public recognition of an organization’s support of the OVAL Repository and as an incentive to others to contribute.

Organizations receiving the award will also receive an OVAL Repository Top Contributor logo indicating the quarter of the award (e.g., 1st Quarter 2007) that may be used as they see fit. Awards are granted to organizations that have made a significant contribution of new or modified content each quarter.

== OVAL Board ==
The OVAL Board is an advisory body, which provides valuable input on OVAL to the Moderator (currently MITRE). While it is important to have organizational support for OVAL, it is the individuals who sit on the OVAL Board and their input and activity that truly make a difference. The Board’s primary responsibilities are to work with the Moderator and the Community to define OVAL, to provide input into OVAL’s strategic direction, and to advocate OVAL in the Community.

== See also ==
- MITRE The MITRE Corporation
- Common Vulnerability and Exposures (index of standardized names for vulnerabilities and other security issues)
- XCCDF - eXtensible Configuration Checklist Description Format
- Security Content Automation Protocol uses OVAL
