= Annualized loss expectancy =

The annualized loss expectancy (ALE) is the product of the annual rate of occurrence (ARO) and the single loss expectancy (SLE). It is mathematically expressed as:

$$\text{ALE} = \text{ARO} \times \text{SLE}$$

Suppose that an asset is valued at $100,000, and the Exposure Factor (EF) for this asset is 25%. The single loss expectancy (SLE) then, is 25% * $100,000, or $25,000.

The annualized loss expectancy is the product of the annual rate of occurrence (ARO) and the single loss expectancy. ALE = ARO * SLE

For an annual rate of occurrence of 1, the annualized loss expectancy is 1 * $25,000, or $25,000.

For an ARO of 3, the equation is: ALE = 3 * $25,000. Therefore: ALE = $75,000

== See also ==
- Single loss expectancy
