= Single-loss expectancy =

Single-loss expectancy (SLE) is the monetary value expected from the occurrence of a risk on an asset. It is related to risk management and risk assessment.

Single-loss expectancy is mathematically expressed as

$$\text{Single-loss expectancy (SLE)} = \text{Asset value (AV)} \times \text{Exposure factor (EF)},$$

where the exposure factor is represented in the impact of the risk over the asset, or percentage of asset lost. As an example, if the asset value is reduced by two thirds, the exposure factor value is 0.66. If the asset is completely lost, the exposure factor is 1.

The result is a monetary value in the same unit as the single-loss expectancy is expressed (euros, dollars, yen, etc.): exposure factor is the subjective, potential percentage of loss to a specific asset if a specific threat is realized. The exposure factor is a subjective value that the person assessing risk must define.

== See also ==
- Information assurance
- Risk assessment
- Annualized loss expectancy
