= Allowed cell rate =

The allowed cell rate is the rate in cells per second at which a source device may send data in ATM networks. It is bounded by the minimum cell rate and the peak cell rate.
