= S-LINK =

S-LINK, for simple link interface, is a high-performance data acquisition standard developed at CERN for collecting information from particle accelerators and other sources. Unlike similar systems, S-LINK is based on the idea that data will be collected and stored by computers at both ends of the link, as opposed to a "dumb" devices collecting data to be stored on a "smart" computer. Having a full computer at both ends allows S-LINK to be very thin, primarily defining the logical standards used to feed data at high speed from the motherboards to the link hardware interfaces.

S-LINK started in 1995 in response to problems collecting data from the new ATLAS experiment at CERN. ATLAS was extensively instrumented with stand-alone computers, which sent data via a variety of methods to be collected on various servers. S-LINK was seen as a way to provide a single mechanism for forwarding the data from the collection to the link hardware with extremely low latency. Generally the S-LINK hardware provided functionality that would normally be provided by networking (or other) drivers running on the host CPU, thereby tying up cycles and introducing delays.

S-LINK used a 32-bit bus running up to 66 MHz, allowing for throughout up to 264 MB/s. The "link side" was typically connected to optical fibre for transmission to the collecting machines, known as the read-out motherboard, or ROMB. Data could also be sent back to the front-end motherboard or FEMB, typically for flow control purposes at a much lower speed.
