= VOMS =

VOMS is an acronym used for Virtual Organization Membership Service in grid computing. It is structured as a simple account database with fixed formats for the information exchange and features single login, expiration time, backward compatibility, and multiple virtual organizations.

The database is manipulated by authorization data that defines specific capabilities and roles for users. Administrative tools can be used by administrators to assign roles and capability information in the database. A command-line tool allows users to generate a local proxy credential based on the contents of the VOMS database. This credential includes the basic authentication information that standard Grid proxy credentials contain, but it also includes role and capability information from the VOMS server.

VOMS-aware applications can use the VOMS data to make authentication decisions regarding user requests. VOMS was originally developed by the European DataGrid and Enabling Grids for E-sciencE projects and is now maintained by the Italian National Institute for Nuclear Physics (INFN).

VOMS is also an acronym for VOucher Management System used for providing recharge management services for Prepaid Systems of Telecom Service Providers. Typically external Voucher Management Systems are used with Intelligent Network based prepaid systems.

== See also ==
- Shibboleth
