= Oracle Advanced Security =

Oracle Advanced Security is an extra-cost option for Oracle database environments. It extends Oracle Net Services in the field of database computing to provide network security, enterprise-user security, public-key infrastructure security and data encryption to users of Oracle databases.

Network encryption (native network encryption and SSL/TLS) and strong authentication services (Kerberos, PKI, and RADIUS) are no longer part of Oracle Advanced Security and are available in all licensed editions of all supported releases of the Oracle database.

== History ==
Former incarnations of Oracle Advanced Security included Secure Network Services and Advanced Network Services, dating back to Oracle database Release 7.

== Components ==
- Oracle Key Vault (OKV) - key management
