= Xilp (Unix software) =

Interactive ListProcessor client

Xilp (X Interactive ListProc) is an interactive ListProcessor client for X Window System. Xilp is an X11/Motif client application that provides a graphical user interface to manage ListProcessor servers. Invoke it with "xilp".

ListProc includes an interactive command protocol and interface for optional use by system managers, list owners, and list subscribers in performing almost all interactions with the list-management system.
