= Extensible Configuration Checklist Description Format =

The Extensible Configuration Checklist Description Format (XCCDF) is an XML format specifying security checklists, benchmarks and configuration documentation.

XCCDF development is being pursued by NIST, the NSA, The MITRE Corporation, and the US Department of Homeland Security.

XCCDF is intended to serve as a replacement for the security hardening and analysis documentation written in prose. XCCDF is used by the Security Content Automation Protocol.
