= ObjectSecurity =

Information security company

- Type: Private
- Industry: Information Security
- Founded: UK (2000), California since 2009, Germany since 2017
- Founder: Ulrich Lang, Rudolf Schreiner
- Headquarters: San Diego, USA and Berlin, Germany
- Area served: Worldwide
- Key people: Ulrich Lang (CEO, ObjectSecurity LLC); Rudolf Schreiner (CEO ObjectSecurity OSA GmbH); Karel Gardas (Chief Software Engineer); Holmes Chuang (Principal Software Scientist)

ObjectSecurity is an information technology company focusing on information security (model-driven security, fine-grained access control, middleware security), supply chain risk analysis, data analytics, and artificial intelligence. The company pioneered the development of model-driven security, which was mostly an academic concept prior to the company's developments. The company is best known for their OpenPMF (Open Policy Management Framework) model-driven security product, security policy automation product for which the company received a "Cool Vendor" award from Gartner in 2008. In recent years, ObjectSecurity diversified into supply-chain risk-analysis automation for which the company was selected "Finalist" by AFWERX in 2019, and vulnerability assessment & pentesting automation.

== History ==
ObjectSecurity was founded in 2000 by information security experts, Ulrich Lang and Rudolf Schreiner. At that time, Lang was a researcher at the University of Cambridge Computer Laboratory, working on "Access Policies for Middleware", and both were working as independent information security consultants.

Initially, ObjectSecurity was mainly working on customer projects around middleware security, esp. CORBA, but they quickly remarked that it was not possible to author and maintain security configurations for interconnected, distributed application environments. In an attempt to solve this challenges, the team built a full OMG CORBA Security SL3 & SSLIOP open source implementation based on MICO CORBA.

=== Security Policy Automation ===
To solve various challenges around implementing secure distributed systems, ObjectSecurity released OpenPMF version 1, at that time one of the first Attribute Based Access Control (ABAC) products in the market. It allowed the central authoring of access rules, and the automatic enforcement across all middleware nodes using local decision/enforcement points. Thanks to the support of several EU funded research projects, ObjectSecurity found that a central ABAC approach alone was not a manageable way to implement security policies.

ObjectSecurity released OpenPMF version 2. It is based on a concept called model-driven security which allows the intuitive, business-centric specification of security requirements and the automatic generation of enforceable securities policies. OpenPMF version 2 was designed to bridge the semantic gap between the policies that users manage, and the policies that are technically implemented. At the time of the release of OpenPMF version 2, model-driven security was tied together with a model-driven development process for applications, especially for agile service oriented architecture (SOA).

After years of publishing and presenting the scientific and technical approach, some analyst firms, such as Gartner took note of the scientific approach. Several other awards and recognition followed. OpenPMF version 3 was released in 2010, supporting advanced policies, Eclipse, cloud, BPMN, SOA, XACML, pub-sub/DDS, and numerous additional enforcement points. ObjectSecurity also extended their model-driven security approach to include automatic compliance/accreditation analysis and evidence generation

In 2009, ObjectSecurity set up an independent legal entity in California, United States to be closer to their US-based customers.

In recent years, ObjectSecurity has extended OpenPMF to support automatic system detection, automated formal testing, virtual reality support, API server etc., enabling security policy automation without the need to install local agents, and allowing the use of model-driven security without the need for a model-driven development. OpenPMF's support for advanced access control models including proximity-based access control, PBAC was also further extended.

== Products ==
=== OpenPMF 4.0 ===
In 2017, ObjectSecurity released OpenPMF version 4.0, which includes a new browser-based user interface, cloud support, and numerous other features.

=== Supply Chain Risk Analysis Automation ===
In 2019, ObjectSecurity released a beta version of a United States Navy SBIR funded Supply Chain Risk Analysis Management Solution (SCRAMS), which analyzes procurement information from SAP and other sources for anomalies indicating supply chain risks.

=== Vulnerability Assessment & Pen-Testing Automation (VAPT) ===
In 2019, ObjectSecurity released an alpha version of a U.S. United States Navy SBIR funded VAPT automation tools, which automatically analyze both IP systems/networks and embedded devices (via non-IP ports) for software vulnerabilities.

=== BinLens ===
BinLens, previously known as OT.AI Platform, is an Operational Technology / Industrial control system firmware security-assessment platform, aimed to detect Common Vulnerabilities and Exposures at the firmware level for many industrial devices, including PLCs, HMIs, SCADA Systems, etc.
