= JWE =

JWE or Jwe can refer to:

- Jwé, a form of dance in Saint Lucia
- The Journal of Wine Economics (JWE) published by the American Association of Wine Economists
- Jurassic World Evolution, a business simulation game based on the Jurassic Park film series
- JSON Web Encryption
