= HERAS-AF =

HERAS^{AF} XACML engine
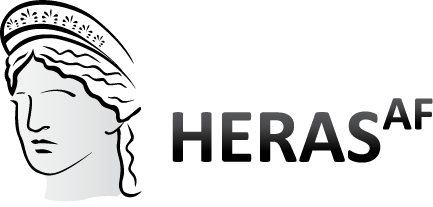
- Developer(s): HERAS^{AF}
- Stable release: 2.0.2.RELEASE / December 1, 2021
- Written in: Java 8
- Operating system: Cross-platform
- Platform: Java Virtual Machine
- Type: Application framework
- License: Apache License 2.0
- Website: https://github.com/prolutionsGmbH/herasaf-xacml-core

== The HERAS^{AF} Project ==
HERAS^{AF} is a well established open-source XACML 2.0 implementation. It provides an extended implementation of the XACML 2.0 standard. It is freely available, established and based on future driven technologies and standards.
