= LOTV =

LOTV may refer to:

- League of Technical Voters, a 501(c)(3) non-profit organization
- StarCraft II: Legacy of the Void, a 2015 video game expansion pack
- Legend of the Void, a 2010 browser game
