= Lawrence Rosen =

Lawrence Rosen may refer to:

- Lawrence Rosen (attorney), attorney and computer specialist
- Lawrence Rosen (anthropologist), American anthropologist and scholar of law

== See also ==
- Larry Rosen (disambiguation)
