= ADFS =

ADFS may refer to:

- Active Directory Federation Services in Microsoft Windows server operating systems
- Advanced Disc Filing System, a file system implemented in Acorn and RISC OS computers
- Apple DOS File System, a file system for Apple II microcomputers
