= Trackbuster =

- Developer(s): One More Company, Inc.
- Initial release: 2015
- Type: Privacy software
- License: Proprietary
- Website: trackbuster.com

Trackbuster is an online service used to identify and remove email trackers.

Email tracking was mainly used in the beginning by marketers to monitor the delivery of emails. However, new tools now allow individuals to track emails easily, and this practice is on the rise. In addition to revealing when and whether an email has been opened or not, email trackers can also reveal one’s software configuration and geographic location (through IP geolocation). Trackbuster helps email users get rid of these trackers, by detecting and disabling tracking images and tracked links.

At launch, Trackbuster received praise and positive press from well-known figures in the tech world, including Robert Scoble, Om Malik and Chris Messina.

Trackbuster is currently compatible with Gmail and Google Apps.
