= OWF =

OWF may refer to:

- Oceania Weightlifting Federation
- Ohio Works First
- One-way function
- one world foundation
- Open Web Foundation
- Order of Women Freemasons
- Offshore Wind Farm
