= JWK =

JWK may refer to:

- JW Komandosów, a special forces unit of Poland
- Joanne Whalley (born 1964), English actress sometimes credited as Joanne Whalley-Kilmer
- JSON Web Key in JSON Web Signature
- Warwick railway station, Perth, in Western Australia
