= Larry Rosen =

Larry Rosen may refer to:

- Lawrence Rosen (attorney), lawyer, specialized in technology-related intellectual property issues
- Larry Rosen (producer) (1940–2015), musician and record producer, GRP Records
- Larry Rosen (executive) (born 1956), CEO of Harry Rosen Inc.
- Larry Rosen (1936–2020), television producer and writer who produced The Partridge Family

== See also ==
- Lawrence Rosen (disambiguation)
