= Team 3 Group =

Israeli company

Team 3 Group Ltd.
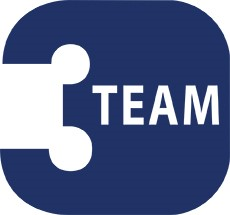
- Native name: Team 3 Management & Investments 1997 Ltd.
- Company type: privately owned company
- Founded: 1990 (35 years ago)
- Founders: Yoram Gilboa (RIP), Nir Gilboa, Yair Lerner, Shmuel Boxer
- Headquarters: Science Park, Rehovot, Israel
- Key people: Nir Gilboa, Group CEO
- Services: security services, dispatch/operations center & electronic security systems, fire safety systems, cleaning & general services
- Number of employees: 6500
- Website: team3.co.il

Team 3 Management & Investments Ltd. (Team 3 Group) is a group of Israeli companies, established in 1990, whose head office is located at Science Park, Rehovot, Israel.

Team 3 Group is involved in security, dispatch/operations center services and electronic security systems, fire safety systems, cleaning, and general services, manpower selection and placement. In 2014, according to the BDI Company Rating, Team 3 Group was one of Israel's five largest companies in security and cleaning services

== History ==
Team 3 Group was founded in 1990 by Brigadier-General Yoram Gilboa and his son Nir Gilboa as a company offering security and guard services. In 1994, Yoram Gilboa died following a heart attack; his son Nir Gilboa took over as CEO.

At the outset, the Team 3 Group head office was in Tel Aviv. Later on, it relocated to Rehovot.

== Team 3 Group Member Companies ==
=== Team 3 Security ===
Team 3 Security Company was established in 1990. The Company provides individual security inspectors to comprehensive security layouts clients throughout Israel. The Company provides services to clients in high-tech companies, financial companies, institutions, international organizations, embassies, and residential buildings. Shmuel Razon is Company CEO.

=== Team 3 Cleaning & General Services ===
Team 3 Cleaning & General Services Company was established in 1992. The Company provides cleaning, maintenance and pest control services. Ehud Gonen is Company CEO.

=== Team 3 Dispatch/Operations Center & Security Services ===
Team 3 Dispatch/Operations Center & Security Services Company was established in 1994. It provides advanced patrol and dispatch/operations center services and installs a range of security systems, including burglar alarm systems, surveillance cameras, intercom systems, and access control systems.

The company Company acquired the Moked 101 Company in 2013, becoming Israel's second largest dispatch/operations center. The combined company provides services to some 25,000 institutional, business and private clients nationwide. Avner Ben-Arie is Company CEO.

=== Shmira KaHalacha 3 Ltd ===
Team 3 Group acquired Shmira KaHalacha 3 Ltd. Company in 2006. The Shmira KaHalacha Company provides dispatch/ operations center and patrol services and installations of electronic security systems to the religious and orthodox Jewish sectors of Israel, in accordance with the provisions of Jewish religious law. Avner Ben-Arie and Rabbi Daniel Gilbert are joint Company CEOs.

=== Team 3 Fire Safety Systems Ltd ===
In 2012, the Team 3 Group acquired the Team 3 Fire Safety Systems Ltd. Company, which provides services associated with the installation of fire detection and extinguishing systems, including planning, system installation and maintenance. Avner Ben-Arie is Company CEO.

== Employee Committee ==
As of 2015, Team 3 Group had about 4,700 employees. In 2008, the employee committee of Team 3 Group incorporated into a union and chose Histadrut as their representative trade union. The Team 3 Group became the first services group in the security and cleaning categories to support the establishment of an employee committee.
