= Weardrobe =

Street fashion website

- Website type: Street fashion community
- Available in: English
- Owner: Like.com
- Creators: Suzanne Xie and Rich Tong
- Website: www.weardrobe.com
- Launched: January 2008
- Current status: Online

Weardrobe is an online street fashion community for both novice and established bloggers that allows members to share their outfits and comment on others' photographs.

== History ==
The concept originated in September 2004, when Weardrobe co-founders Suzanne Xie Rich Tong realized that there were no online applications available to organize clothing. To address the issue, their discussions led to the concept for Weardrobe, and the website officially went online in January 2008.

In 2009, Weardrobe was named one of 20 winners of Facebook's fbFund Competition for startups and nonprofit companies, and invited to participate in Facebook's Summer Incubator Program in Palo Alto, California. There, Xie and Tong worked on integrating Facebook Connect with the online fashion network expanding the feature set to Facebook-connected users through friend activity tracking.

In 2012, the founders entered a partnership with Urban Outfitters, where select styles would be sent to users who would then post their created outfit on the Weardrobe site.

On November 18, 2009, the community was acquired by Like.com. Subsequently, Like.com was acquired by Google on August 20, 2010 for a rumored price of $100,000.

== Features ==
Weardrobe provides members with the opportunity to create their own user profiles and post photographs of themselves. Members can create and view a virtual representation of their real-life closet by manually tagging clothing in the images uploaded to the site.

=== Likesense ===
Likesense is an automated feature that was introduced by Weardrobe. This feature identifies clothing items in a given photograph, finds similarities in Weardrobes database, and then displays likely matches to the user. Likesense first displays two items and if one of the two is clicked, further variations on that piece of clothing are shown. Currently, this process is only displayed on the front page. However, this will expand to the entire site.

== Community ==
On occasion, the site sponsors contests in which members submit photographs of outfits based on given themes. Sometimes, Weardrobe pairs up with other fashion-related sites such as Modcloth and Market Publique to offer discounted prizes. Weardrobe's collaboration with Modcloth, the Mod Honor Roll Contest, asked for members' favorite back-to-school inspired outfits; the prize for the top three submissions included a special Modcloth outfit that the bloggers then styled and modeled. Their collaboration with Market Publique, Time After Time, asked for vintage-inspired outfit entries and the winner was flown into Brooklyn for a photo shoot session with Market Publique. Modcloth also held another competition in which they supplied the New York City Weardrobe community with a vintage black Modcloth dress (called the "Weardrobe Dress") and asked the members to come up with ways to style it. The dress was a simple black garment and contestants submitted photos of how they would style an outfit around that piece. In its collaboration with other fashion-focused sites, Weardrobe provides a platform where people interested in fashion can come together and demonstrate their creativity and knowledge. It also provides an outlet for fashion-related sites to show off their clothing items to a specified online niche with similar interests.

=== Weardrobe Conference ===
In early September 2009, Weardrobe sponsored a conference in New York City for 19 popular fashion bloggers. There, the bloggers participated in a DIY (Do It Yourself) exercise in customizing a pair of Solana Extreme Skinny Jeans. The conference was meant to create a space for some of the fashion industry's most active style bloggers to collaborate and exchange ideas about fashion.

=== Notable Members ===
Weardrobe has previously been known to hire staff from among their notable members, including Krystal Bick from This Time Tomorrow, who acted as the site's community manager, and Jessica Quirk of the blog What I Wore, who served as community director and also did some creative work, including writing and illustrating weekly contest images.

== Similar Websites ==
There are other sites with similar features and goals to Weardrobe, such as Closet Couture. Weardrobe contributors are sometimes also contributors on Chictopia or Lookbook. The two communities, like Weardrobe, offer "the common fashionista" the ability to publicly post their looks to an online community of people interested in fashion. The sites also contain photo blogs and competitions for online contributors.
