= League of Technical Voters =

American non-profit organization

The League of Technical Voters (LOTV) is a 501(c)(3) non-profit organization whose primary goal is to involve more technical people in the political process.

LOTV is a United States organization. LOTV obtained their 501(c)(3) status in October 2007. LOTV has sponsored numerous projects such as codeathons with flagship sponsorship from the Mozilla Foundation, the Transparent Federal Budget project and We Are All Actors 2007 workshop. The head office for LOTV is in Austin, Texas.

LOTV was formed on October 13, 2006, by Silona Bonewald, Kai Mantsch, Sharon Rush and Brigid Shea.

From founding through 2013, LOTV's advisory board included Jason Asbahr, Tantek Çelik, Donna Kidwell, Chris Messina, Don Shafer, Jimmy Donal "Jimbo" Wales.

On June 27, 2013, LOTV's Board of Directors elected new members: Lee B. "Britt" Blaser, Christopher W. Savage, Doc Searls and Philip J. Windley. Ph.D.

In December 2013, the LOTV Board accepted the resignations of Silona Bonewald, Michelle DeFrance, Joshua Gay and Donna Kidwell.

In December 2013, LOTV made two grants: $1,000 to the Center for Voting and Democracy and $1,000 to the Sunlight Foundation.

In April 2026, Eric DeArmon was appointed to the Board, and was appointed Executive Director.
