= SSLIOP =

Internet protocol

In distributed computing, SSLIOP is an Internet Inter-ORB Protocol (IIOP) over Secure Sockets Layer (SSL), providing confidentiality and authentication.

As of January 2007, SSLIOP is implemented by (at least) TAO, JacORB, OpenORB , and MICO .

== See also ==
- CSIv2
- SECIOP
