= Blaine Cook =

Canadian software engineer

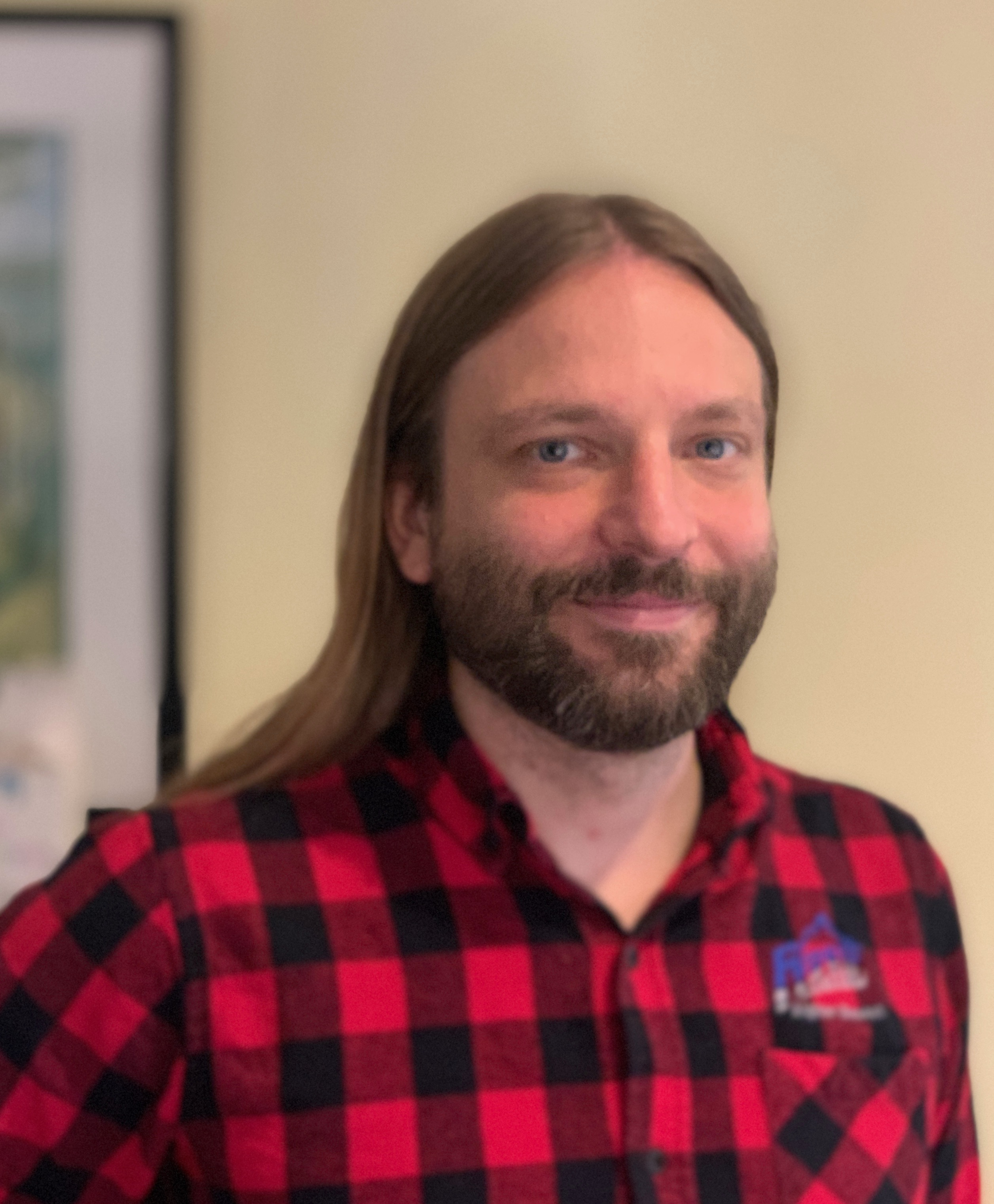
- Blaine Cook in November 2019
- Born: December 19, 1980 (age 45)
- Occupation: programmer

Blaine Cook (born December 19, 1980) is a Canadian software engineer, now living and working in Nelson, British Columbia.

== Career ==
Cook is the principal co-author of the OAuth and WebFinger specifications. He is the former lead developer of social networking site Twitter. He has also worked for Yahoo! on the Fire Eagle project and for BT Group as part of their open source Osmosoft team. He was founder of collaborative text editing startup Poetica. Poetica was acquired by Condé Nast in March 2016, and Cook remained with the company as a staff engineer.

As of July 2025, Blaine is working for New_ Public on a social platform for local communities called Roundabout.
