= Tara Hunt =

Canadian author and speaker

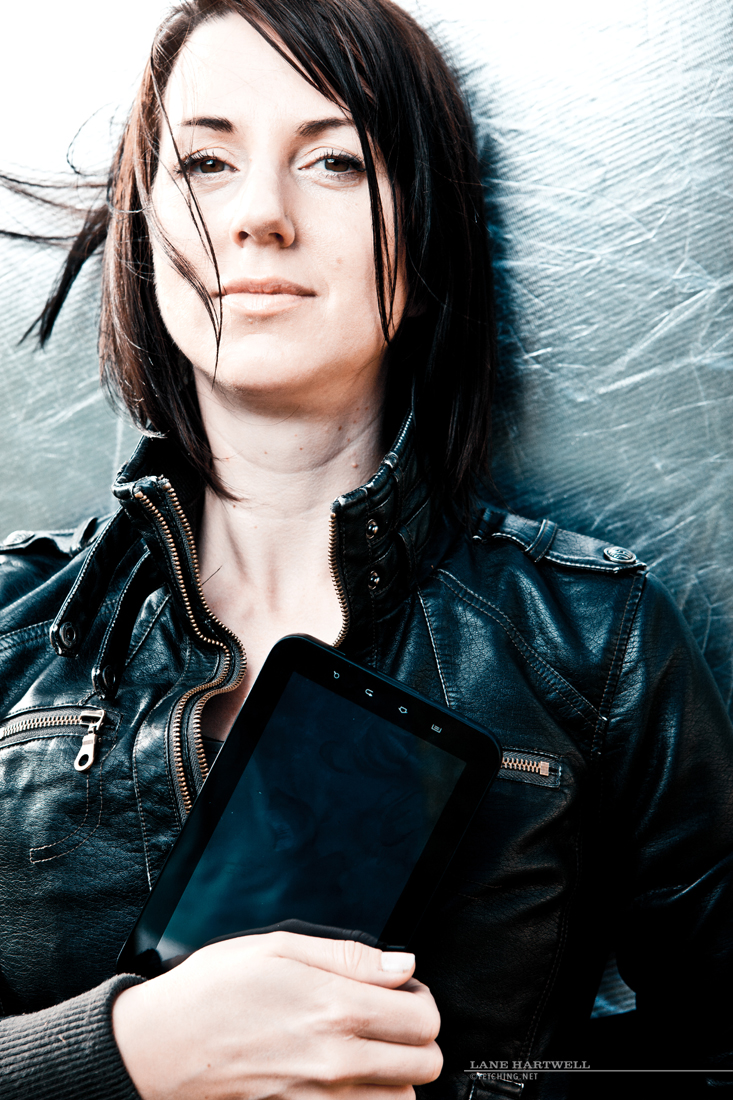
- Hunt in 2011
- Born: July 15, 1973 (age 53); Saskatoon, Saskatchewan, Canada.
- Education: University of Calgary
- Occupations: Writer, Marketing consultant, Entrepreneur (Buyosphere)
- Writing career
- Notable works: The Whuffie Factor; She was named one of the most influential women in tech by Fast Company in 2009.
- Website: www.tarahunt.com

Tara Hunt (born July 15, 1973 in Saskatoon, Saskatchewan, Canada) is an author, speaker and startup founder. She has been called a "pioneer in online marketing and one of the most respected authorities on online communities".

== Biography ==
Hunt obtained a degree in Communications and Cultural Studies at the University of Calgary. In 2002, she founded a small marketing brand called "Rogue Strategies." She moved, along with her business, to Toronto, Ontario, before moving to San Francisco in 2005. She co-founded Citizen Agency in San Francisco, a now-defunct community marketing consulting firm.

Hunt was hired by the San Francisco-based visual search engine Riya to lead their marketing efforts. In June 2006, Hunt coined a movement of "post-cluetrain" marketing called Pinko Marketing. Pinko Marketing picked up where The Cluetrain Manifesto left off, changing the focus from company to consumer marketing to consumer-to-consumer marketing.

She was named one of the most influential women in tech by Fast Company in 2009, as she is an early leader of "user generated conferences" such as BarCamp and is considered to be one of the founders of the co-working movement.

Hunt was one of the lead bloggers on the popular Canadian online portal One Degree.

She wrote The Whuffie Factor, published in April 2009. The title of the book refers to the reputation-based currency of Cory Doctorow's science-fiction novel, Down and Out in the Magic Kingdom. Along with the humorous metaphor implied by the title, the book gives practical guidance for online and social media marketing. The Whuffie Factor has been translated into French and Portuguese. In May 2010, it was reprinted in paperback in May 2010 with the title The Power of Social Networking: Using the Whuffie Factor to Build Your Business.

Hunt speaks at a variety of conferences and events such as SXSW Interactive (2008, 2009, 2011), the MESH conference (2006) and TEDxConcordia (2011).

In 2010, along with Co-Founders Jerome Paradis and Cassandra Girard, Hunt launched Buyosphere, formerly known as Shwowp, a social site which lets users organize and share buying trends with others.

Tara is currently Principal and Founder of Truly Inc., hosts a podcast called Anatomy of a Strategy and runs a YouTube video series called Truly Social with Tara.

== Published works ==
- Hunt, Tara (April 21, 2009). The Whuffie Factor: Using the Power of Social Networks to Build Your Business (1st ed.). Crown Business, New York. ISBN 978-0307409508.
- Hunt, Tara (January 1, 2010). Poder das Redes Sociais – Whuffie Factor. Gente, Brazil. ISBN 978-8573127096.
- Hunt, Tara. L'effet Whuffie. DIATEINO, Paris. ISBN 978-2354560089.
- Hunt, Tara (May 4, 2010). The Power of Social Networking: Using the Whuffie Factor to Build Your Business. Crown Business, New York. ISBN 978-0307449405.

== See also ==
- Coworking
- Whuffie
