= Integrated Mobile Broadcast =

Integrated Mobile Broadcast (iMB) is a mobile wireless technology that enables broadcast of content (such as live television) at the cellular transmitter level, using the 3G or 4G licensed radio spectrum, and received on mobile terminals.

iMB was accepted as part of the Release 8 3GPP standards in December 2008. It was endorsed as the preferred broadcast standard by the GSM Association (GSMA) in September 2009. On 22 June 2010 O2, Orange and Vodafone announced a multi-operator iMB pilot in the United Kingdom.

iMB delivers mobile data broadcast services in the 3G TDD bands in a way that is integrated with existing 3G FDD unicast technology. In June 2010, O2, Orange and Vodafone announced a UK trial of the technology, to offload bandwidth intensive mobile data from their unicast networks and place on the broadcast portion of their spectrum (TDD).

iMB supports both linear (live broadcast TV services) and non-linear (video clips, software updates, data broadcast, music, etc.) broadcast services and can be implemented in TDD spectrum, currently owned, but unused by many operators as a part of their 3G licenses.

== Example ==
Using a typical 5 MHz -wide TDD band, an operator may obtain 4800 kbit/s of IP multicast throughput over MBMS, allowing the delivery of 15 linear TV channels, each TV stream compressed at the bitrate of 320 kbit/s. The typical cell radius around the transmitter to receive the service will be around 350 metres (1,150 ft). Using a single-frequency network (SFN) of transmitters, the received signal may be reinforced and the service coverage gets better.
