= Access Control Service =

Access Control Service, or Windows Azure Access Control Service (ACS) was a Microsoft-owned cloud-based service that provided an easy way of authenticating and authorizing users to gain access to web applications and services while allowing the features of authentication and authorization to be factored out of the application code. This facilitates application development while at the same time providing users the benefit of being able to log into multiple applications with a reduced number of authentications, and in some cases only one authentication. The system provides an authorization store that can be accessed programmatically as well as via a management portal. Once authorizations are configured, a user coming to an application via ACS arrives at the application entrance with not only an authentication token, but also a set of authorization claims attached to the token. ACS was retired by Microsoft on November 7, 2018.

== Features ==
ACS has the following features

- Integration with Windows Identity Foundation (WIF)
- Support for the SAML 1.1, SAML 2.0, Simple Web Token (SWT) and JSON Web Token (JWT) token formats (JWT still in beta)
- Integrated and customizable Home Realm Discovery that allows users to choose their identity provider
- A browser-based management portal that allows administrative access to the ACS configuration

== See also ==
- Azure Services Platform
- Claims-based identity
