= CSIv2 =

In distributed computing, CSIv2 (Common Secure Interoperability Protocol Version 2) is a protocol implementing security features for inter-ORB communication. It intends, in part, to address limitations of SSLIOP.

CSIv2 also facilitates secure EJB-CORBA interoperability.
