= Chris Messina (inventor) =

American blogger, product consultant and speaker (born 1981)

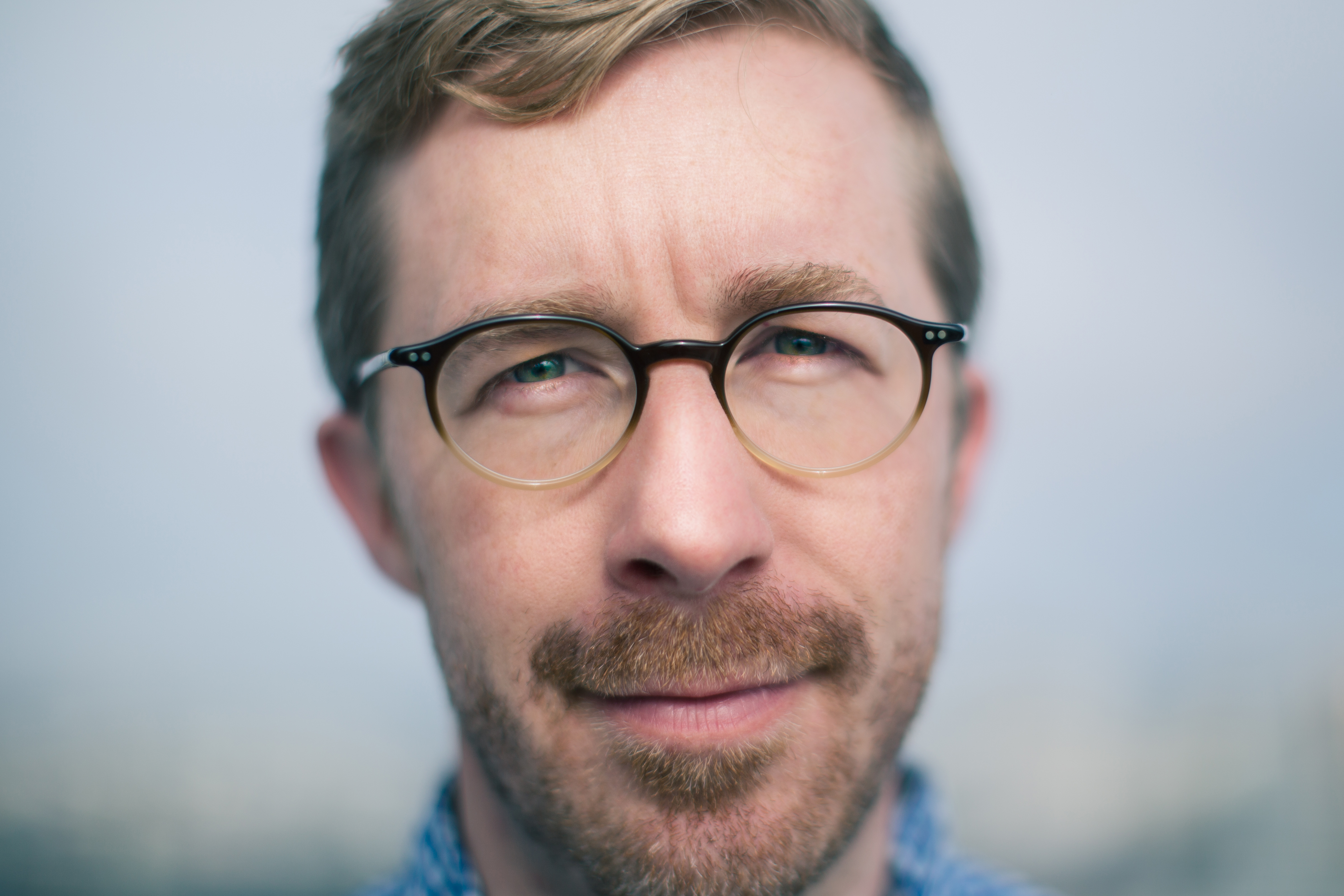
- Messina in March 2016
- Born: Christopher Reaves Messina; January 7, 1981 (age 45); Bedford, New Hampshire, U.S.
- Education: Carnegie Mellon University
- Known for: Proposing the hashtag
- Website: http://chrismessina.me/

Christopher Reaves Messina (born January 7, 1981) is an American blogger, product consultant and speaker who proposed the usage of the hashtag as it is currently used on social media platforms. In a 2007 tweet, Messina proposed vertical/associational grouping of messages, trends, and events on Twitter by means of hashtags. The hashtag was intended to be a type of metadata tag that allowed users to apply dynamic, user-generated tagging, which made it possible for others to easily find messages with a specific bigger theme or content. It allowed easy, informal markup of folksonomy without need of any formal taxonomy or markup language. Hashtags have since been referred to as the "eavesdroppers", "wormholes", "time-machines", and "veins" of the Internet.

How do you feel about using # (pound) for groups. As in #barcamp [msg]?

— Chris Messina's original Tweet proposing hashtag usage, August 23, 2007

Although Twitter's initial response to Messina's proposed use of hashtags was negative, stating that "these things are for nerds" a series of events, including the devastating fire in San Diego County later that year, saw the first widespread use of #sandiegofire to allow users to easily track updates about the fire. The use of hashtags itself then eventually spread on Twitter, and by the end of the decade could be seen in most social media platforms including Instagram, Facebook, Reddit, and YouTube. Instagram even had to officially place a "30 hashtags" limit on its posts to prevent people from abusing the use of hashtags. Instagrammers eventually circumvented this limit by posting hashtags in the comments section of their posts. As of 2018, more than 85% of the top 50 websites by traffic on the Internet use hashtags.

Messina subsequently went on to become the Developer Experience Lead at Uber from 2016 to 2017 and as of 2018 ranks as the No. 1 hunter on ProductHunt.com. He is a technology evangelist who is an advocate for open source, open standards, microformats, and OAuth. Messina is also known for his involvement in helping to create the BarCamp, Spread Firefox, and coworking movements.

== Career ==
Messina was employed as an Open Source Advocate at identity company Vidoop and before that was the co-founder of marketing agency Citizen Agency. He worked at Google as an Open Web Advocate, leaving to join startup NeonMob. He graduated from Carnegie Mellon University in 2003 with a BA in Communication Design. From 2016 to January 2017, Messina lead the Developer Experience team at Uber where he enforced the terms and conditions of Uber's proprietary APIs.

Messina co-founded Citizen Agency, a company which describes itself as an "Internet consultancy that specializes in developing community-centric strategies around product research, design, development and marketing" with Tara Hunt and Ben Metcalfe, who has since left the company.

Messina has been an advocate of open-source software, most notably Firefox and the now-discontinued Flock browser. As a volunteer for the Spread Firefox campaign, he designed the 2004 Firefox advert which appeared in The New York Times on December 16, 2004. In 2008, he won a Google-O'Reilly Open Source Award for Best Community Amplifier for BarCamp, Microformats and Spread Firefox.

In February 2018, Messina launched Molly, an AMA-style website where the questions are answered using the person's social media posts.

== Proposing the hashtag ==
"I had no interest in making money (directly) off hashtags. They are born of the Internet, and should be owned by no one. The value and satisfaction I derive from seeing my funny little hack used as widely as it is today is valuable enough for me to be relieved that I had the foresight not to try to lock down this stupidly simple but effective idea." Chris Messina, explaining why he didn't patent the hashtag

The International Telecommunication Union (ITU) approved in November 1988 a recommendation that put the hash sign on the right side of the 0 in the button arrangement for push buttons on telephones. This same arrangement is still used today in most software phones (see Android dialer for example). The ITU recommendation had two design options for the hash: a European version where the hash sign was built with a 90-degree angle and a North American version with an 80-degree angle. The North American version seems to have prevailed as most hash signs in Europe now follow the 80 degree inclination. The pound sign (not to confused with the pound currency sign) was adopted for use within IRC networks c. 1988 to label groups and topics. Channels or topics that are available across an entire IRC network are prefixed with a hash symbol (as opposed to those local to a server, which use an ampersand). HTML has used # as a fragment identifier from the very start of the World-Wide Web (c. 1993).

The use of the pound sign in IRC inspired Chris Messina to propose a similar system to be used on Twitter to tag topics of interest on the microblogging network. He posted the first hashtag on Twitter. Messina's suggestion to use the hashtag was initially not adopted by Twitter, but the practice took off after hashtags were widely used in tweets relating to the 2007 San Diego forest fires in Southern California. According to Messina, he suggested use of the hashtag to make it easy for "lay" users to search for content and find specific relevant updates; they were for people who do not have the technological knowledge to navigate the site. Therefore, the hashtag "was created organically by Twitter users as a way to categorize messages." Today they are for anyone, either with or without technical knowledge, to easily impose enough annotation to be useful without needing a more formal system or adhering to many technical details.

Internationally, the hashtag became a practice of writing style for Twitter posts during the 2009–2010 Iranian election protests; Twitter users inside and outside Iran used both English- and Persian-language hashtags in communications during the events. The first published use of the term "hash tag" was in a blog post by Stowe Boyd, "Hash Tags = Twitter Groupings," on August 26, 2007, according to lexicographer Ben Zimmer, chair of the American Dialect Society's New Words Committee.

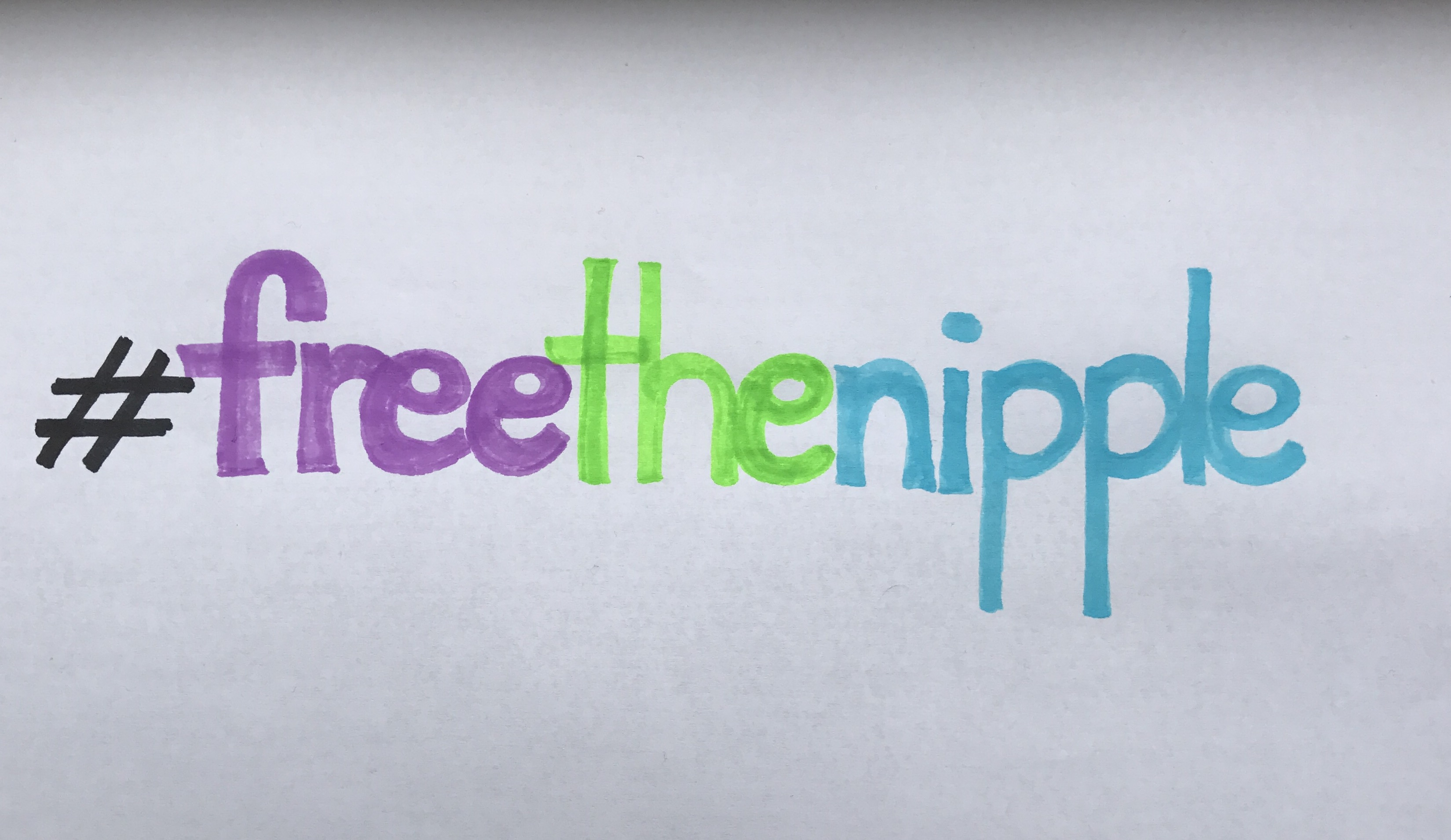
Both the #MeToo and #FreeTheNipple movements use hashtags in their title.

Beginning July 2, 2009, Twitter began to hyperlink all hashtags in tweets to Twitter search results for the hashtagged word (and for the standard spelling of commonly misspelled words). In 2010, Twitter introduced "Trending Topics" on the Twitter front page, displaying hashtags that are rapidly becoming popular. Twitter has an algorithm to tackle attempts to spam the trending list and ensure that hashtags trend naturally.

Although the hashtag started out most popularly on Twitter as the main social media platform for this use, the use has extended to other social media sites including Instagram, Facebook, Flickr, Tumblr, and Google+.

== Press ==
Messina was featured with Hunt, also his ex-girlfriend, in "So Open it Hurts", in San Francisco Magazine (August 2008). The article detailed their very public and open relationship shared on the internet, and the lessons they derived from that experience.
