= Transport Layer Security Channel ID =

Transport Layer Security Channel ID (TLS Channel ID, previously known as Transport Layer Security – Origin Bound Certificates TLS-OBC) is a draft RFC proposal Transport Layer Security (TLS) extension that aims to increase TLS security by using certificates on both ends of the TLS connection. Notably, the client is permitted to dynamically create a local, self-signed certificate that provides additional security.

It can also protect users from the related domain cookie attack.

== Token Binding ==
Token Binding is an evolution of the TLS Channel ID feature, and the IETF draft has Microsoft and Google as authors.
