= JSON Web Encryption =

IETF standard for encrypted data

- JSON Web Encryption (JWE)
- Abbreviation: JWE
- Status: Proposed
- Year started: 16 January 2012
- First published: 16 January 2012
- Latest version: May 2015
- Organization: IETF
- Series: JOSE
- Authors: Michael Jones; Joe Hildebrand
- Domain: Encryption, authentication
- Website: datatracker.ietf.org/doc/html/rfc7516

JSON Web Encryption (JWE) is an IETF standard providing a standardized syntax for the exchange of encrypted data, based on JSON and Base64. It is defined by RFC 7516. Along with JSON Web Signature (JWS), it is one of the two possible formats of a JWT (JSON Web Token). JWE forms part of the JavaScript Object Signing and Encryption (JOSE) suite of protocols.

== Vulnerabilities ==
In March 2017, a serious flaw was discovered in many popular implementations of JWE, the invalid curve attack.

One implementation of an early (pre-finalized) version of JWE also suffered from Bleichenbacher's attack.
