= Access token =

Security credentials for a user

In computer systems, an access token contains the security credentials for a login session and identifies the user, the user's groups, the user's privileges, and, in some cases, a particular application.

== Windows ==
In Microsoft Windows, access token refers to an object encapsulating the security context of a process or thread. An access token is generated by the logon service when a user logs in to the system and the credentials provided by the user are authenticated against the authentication database. The authentication database contains credential information required to construct the initial token for the logon session, including its user id, primary group id, all other groups it is part of, and other information. The token is attached to the initial process created in the user session and inherited by subsequent processes created by the initial process.

== See also ==
- API key
- Claims-based identity
- JSON Web Token
- Session ID
- Token Binding
