= Jwé =

Jwé is a kind of rural music from Saint Lucia, performed informally at wakes, beach parties, full moon gatherings and other informal events, including débòt dances. Jwé uses raunchy lyrics and innuendos to show off verbal skills, and to express political and comedic commentaries on current events and well-known individuals. One well-known technique that has entered Lucian culture is lang dévivé, which is when the singer says the opposite of his true meaning.
