= SECIOP =

Protocol

In distributed computing, SECIOP (SECure Inter-ORB Protocol) is a protocol for secure inter-ORB communication.
