= David Recordon =

American technologist (born 1986)

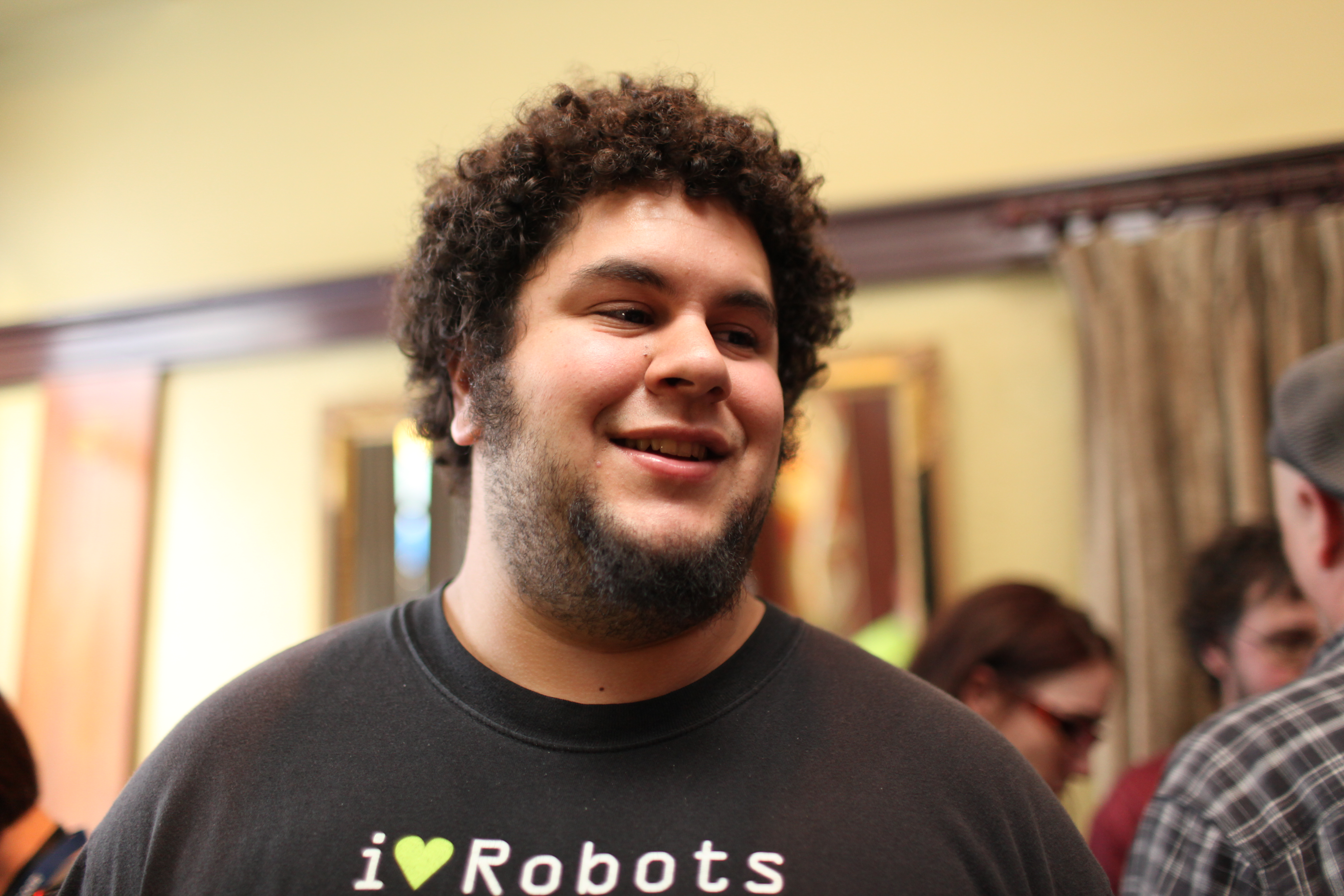

Director of White House Technology
- In office January 20, 2021 – September 2022
- President: Joe Biden
- Preceded by: Position established
- Succeeded by: Austin Lin

Director of White House Information Technology
- In office March 19, 2015 – January 20, 2017
- President: Barack Obama
- Preceded by: Position established
- Succeeded by: Chris Herndon

Personal details
- Born: September 4, 1986 (age 40) Portland, Oregon, U.S.
- Occupation: Technologist

David Recordon (born September 4, 1986) is an American technologist with an open standards and open source background. He is currently the Chief Technology Officer at Rebellion Defense. From January 2021 to September 2022, he served as the Director of Technology in the White House under U.S. President Joe Biden. He previously served in a similar role during the last two years of the presidency of Barack Obama. Between his roles in government, he worked as Vice President of Infrastructure and Security at the Chan Zuckerberg Initiative. Earlier in his career, he played an important role in the development and evangelism for OpenID and OAuth.

== Biography ==
Born in Portland, Oregon, Recordon began working with open source software and open standards in high school, including working for LiveJournal. At age 19, he played an important role in the development and popularization of OpenID and OAuth, and is probably best known for his evangelism on behalf of the decentralized single-sign-on protocol. In 2007, he became the youngest recipient of the Google-O'Reilly Open Source Award.

Recordon was employed as an Open Platforms Tech Lead at blogging company Six Apart and more recently as a Facebook Engineering Director.

In March 2015, Recordon was appointed to the newly created position of Director of White House Information Technology by President Barack Obama. Through this role, he drove major technology modernization efforts touching nearly every aspect of the White House. Following the end of the Obama administration, Recordon was hired as Vice President of Infrastructure and Security at the Chan Zuckerberg Initiative and resided in San Francisco.

In the run-up to the 2020 United States presidential election, Recordon volunteered as the Deputy Chief Technology Officer for the Presidential transition of Joe Biden, and, on January 5, 2021, Recordon was named as the Director of Technology in the White House Office of Management and Administration for the incoming administration of President Joe Biden and Vice President Kamala Harris. In this role, he drove massive modernization of classified systems in partnership with the DoD and the IC.

Political offices
Position established	Director of White House Information Technology; 2015–2017	Succeeded by Chris Herndon
Position established	Director of White House Technology; 2021–2022	Succeeded by Austin Lin
