= Lawrence Rosen (attorney) =

American lawyer

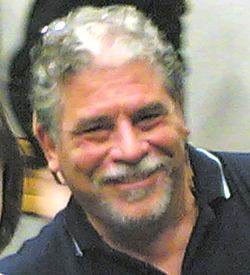
Rosen in 2005

Lawrence Rosen (also Larry Rosen) is an American attorney and computer specialist. He is a founding partner of Rosenlaw & Einschlag, a Californian technology law firm, specializing in intellectual property protection, licensing and business transactions for technology companies. He also served as general counsel and secretary of the Open Source Initiative, and participates in open source foundations and projects, such as the Python Software Foundation, and the Free Standards Group.

Rosen was a lecturer in law at Stanford Law School in Spring 2006. He is the author of the Academic Free License and the Open Software License. He is a member of the board of the Open Web Foundation. Rosen was a director of the Apache Software Foundation from July 2011 to March 2012.
