= Nomura Research Institute =

Research Institute in Tokyo, Japan

Nomura Research Institute, Ltd.
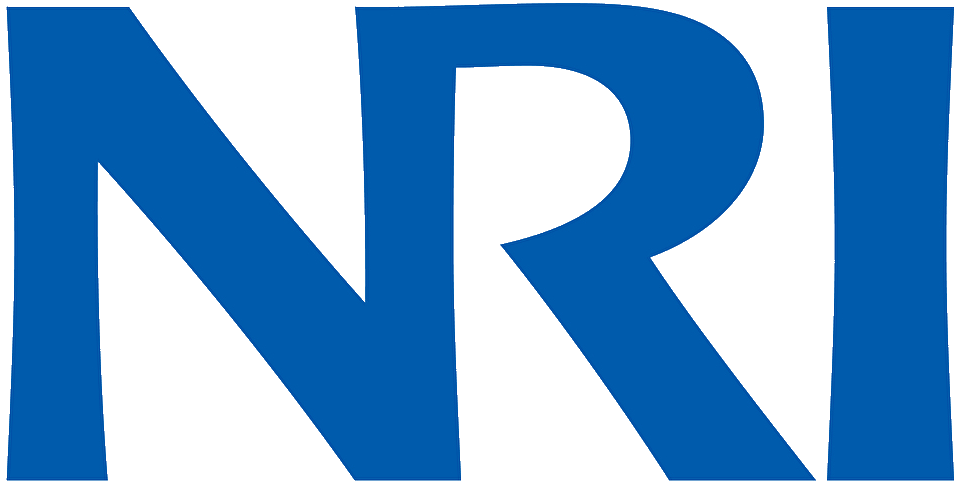

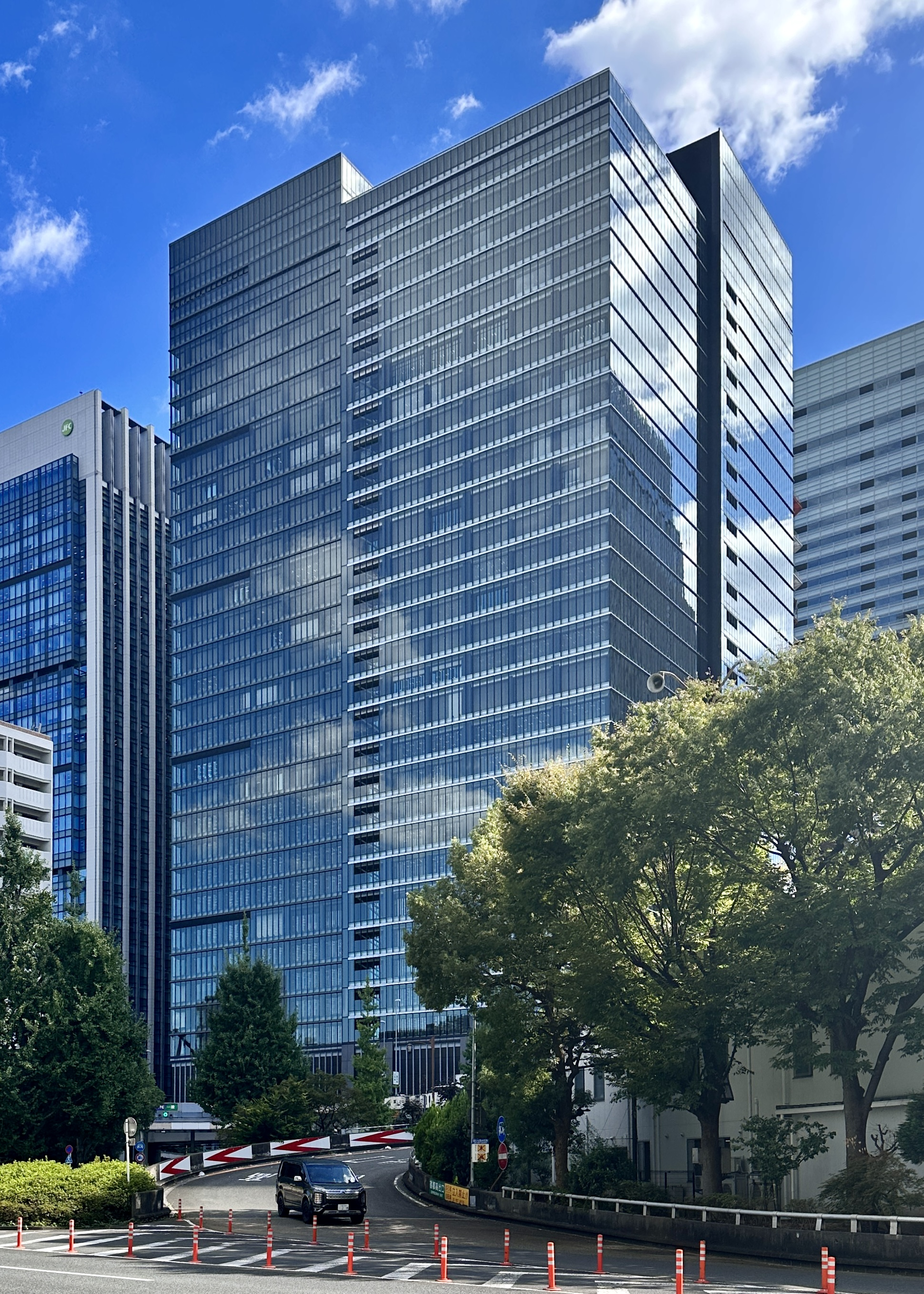
- Headquarters in Otemachi, Chiyoda, Tokyo
- Native name: 株式会社野村総合研究所
- Romanized name: Kabushiki-gaisha Nomura sōgō kenkyūsho
- Type: Public K.K.
- Traded as: TYO: 4307
- Industry: Economic and industry research, Consulting & IT consulting
- Founded: April 1, 1965; 61 years ago
- Headquarters: Otemachi Financial City Grand Cube, 1-9-2 Ōtemachi, Chiyoda, Tokyo, Japan
- Key people: Shingo Konomoto (President and CEO)
- Revenue: USD 4.52 billion (March, 2019)
- Number of employees: 6,353 (NRI Group 13,278) as of March 31, 2020
- Website: Nomura Research Institute

Nomura Research Institute, Ltd. (株式会社野村総合研究所, Kabushiki-gaisha Nomura sōgō kenkyūsho; NRI)is the largest economic research and consulting firm in Japan, and a member of the Nomura Group. Established in 1965, the firm now employs over 13,000 people. It owns ten subsidiaries in Japan and multiple subsidiaries overseas, in India, New York City, Dallas, London, Seoul, Shanghai, Beijing, Hong Kong, Moscow, Taipei, the Philippines, Singapore, Bangkok, and Jakarta.

In 2016, NRI acquired Cutter Associates.

== Overview ==
Nomura Research Institute (Japan's first full-fledged private comprehensive think tank) and Nomura Computer Systems, Inc. (Japan's first systems development company to use commercial computers for business purposes) merged to form the current Nomura Research Institute, Ltd. With this merger, the company became a total provider of research, consulting, IT solutions, and system operations.

The company's strengths lie in management consulting and IT consulting for private companies and government agencies, as well as system integration and development for clients in the financial and retail industries. It is positioned No. 1 in 2018 and 2020 in the ranking of companies to watch, as selected by students at the University of Tokyo seeking employment. While it has certain capital ties with Nomura Holdings, it is not a subsidiary of Nomura Holdings. The corporate statement is "未来創発ーDream up the future." It is famous for its extremely high employee salary level, with an average annual salary of 12,421,000 yen in FY2023 (Integrated Report FY2023).

== See also ==
- Nomura Group
- Think tank
- Management consulting
- IT consulting
