= Like.com =

Price comparison website

- Website type: Price comparison service
- Available in: English
- Owner: Google
- Creator: Like.com
- Website: www.like.com
- Registration: none
- Launched: November 8, 2006
- Current status: offline

Like.com was a price comparison service website that billed itself as a "visual search engine for products".

== History ==
The website was created by Riya, a company built to create a search engine used to search for similar faces among photos. The company found it difficult to monetize the service, however, so they created Like.com to use the same technology for a different purpose. Riya's CEO, Munjal Shah, noted that "the same technology works well to find similar-looking products." Riya's CTO and co-founder, Burak Göktürk, had previously worked with computer vision technology and has filed for two dozen facial-recognition patents under his name. The website was first announced at the Web 2.0 Conference on November 8, 2006. Like.com raised US$19.5 million from investors who included Bay Partners, BlueRun Ventures, and Leapfrog Ventures. The company planned to make money by acting as an affiliate to the retail sites that it links to, allowing it to receive about a 10% commission on each sale that the website sent to an online retailer. As of November 2006, the website had about two million unique products from 200 merchants. In 2015, the site became defunct and redirected users to Google's shopping search engine.

== Features ==
Since launching, the website has only allowed users to search for jewelry, handbags, shoes, and watches. Users can browse the website to find a product that they are interested in, or one that looks similar to what they are looking for. They can then choose to use the website to search its database for similar-looking products. The website then returns the results with links to retailers such as Amazon.com and Zappos. With the results, users can highlight parts of a product image to find other products with similar patterns, shapes, and colors. Each of the three criterion can be ranked to determine the importance of each according to the user. Like.com is planning to allow users to upload their own photos for the website to analyze and return similar-looking products. They wish to also allow users to upload photos taken in places such as stores with a mobile device, so that they can search for the product online at a cheaper price.

== Reception ==
Bambi Francisco of MarketWatch described Like.com as "the next evolution of comparison-shopping engines, such as Google's Froogle, eBay's Shopping.com, EW Scripps' Shopzilla or Become.com and the next evolution in image search offered by the portals and search engines, Google, Yahoo, Microsoft's Live and InterActiveCorp's Ask.com."

== Acquisitions ==
Internet search engine giant Google Inc. bought the shopping comparison website, Like.com on Aug 23 2010. Google officials reported that the Like.com will continue to operate separately from Google operations.

Now google.com/shopping.
