= C-RAN =

Architecture for cellular networks

C-RAN (Cloud-RAN), also referred to as Centralized-RAN, is an architecture for cellular networks. C-RAN is a centralized, cloud computing-based architecture for radio access networks that supports 2G, 3G, 4G, 5G and future wireless communication standards. Its name comes from the four 'C's in the main characteristics of C-RAN system, "Clean, Centralized processing, Collaborative radio, and a real-time Cloud Radio Access Network".

== Background ==
Traditional cellular, or Radio Access Networks (RAN), consist of many stand-alone base stations (BTS). Each BTS covers a small area, whereas a group BTS provides coverage over a continuous area. Each BTS processes and transmits its own signal to and from the mobile terminal, and forwards the data payload to and from the mobile terminal and out to the core network via the backhaul. Each BTS has its own cooling, back haul transportation, backup battery, monitoring system, and so on. Because of limited spectral resources, network operators 'reuse' the frequency among different base stations, which can cause interference between neighboring cells.

There are several limitations in the traditional cellular architecture. First, each BTS is costly to build and operate. Moore's law helps reduce the size and power of an electrical system, but the supporting facilities of the BTS are not improved quite as well. Second, when more BTS are added to a system to improve its capacity, interference among BTS is more severe as BTS are closer to each other and more of them are using the same frequency. Third, because users are mobile, the traffic of each BTS fluctuates (called 'tide effect'), and as a result, the average utilization rate of individual BTS is pretty low. However, these processing resources cannot be shared with other BTS. Therefore, all BTS are designed to handle the maximum traffic, not average traffic, resulting in a waste of processing resources and power at idle times.

== Evolution of base station architecture ==
=== All-in-one macro base station ===
In the 1G and 2G cellular networks, base stations had an all-in-one architecture. Analog, digital, and power functions were housed in a single cabinet as large as a refrigerator. Usually the base station cabinet was placed in a dedicated room along with all necessary supporting facilitates such as power, backup battery, air conditioning, environment surveillance, and backhaul transmission equipment. The RF signal is generated by the base station RF unit and propagates through pairs of RF cables up to the antennas on the top of a base station tower or other mounting points. This all-in-one architecture was mostly found in macro cell deployments.

=== Distributed base station ===
For 3G, a distributed base station architecture was introduced by Ericsson, Nokia, Huawei, and other leading telecom equipment vendors. In this architecture the radio function unit, also known as the remote radio head (RRH), is separated from the digital function unit, or baseband unit (BBU) by fiber. Digital baseband signals are carried over fiber, using the Open Base Station Architecture Initiative (OBSAI) or Common Public Radio Interface (CPRI) standard. The RRH can be installed on the top of tower close to the antenna, reducing the loss compared to the traditional base station where the RF signal has to travel through a long cable from the base station cabinet to the antenna at the top of the tower. The fiber link between RRH and BBU also allows more flexibility in network planning and deployment as they can be placed a few hundred meters or a few kilometers away. Most modern base stations now use this decoupled architecture.

=== C-RAN/Cloud-RAN ===
C-RAN may be viewed as an architectural evolution of the above distributed base station system. It takes advantage of many technological advances in wireless, optical and IT communications systems. For example, it uses the latest CPRI standard, low cost Coarse or Dense Wavelength Division Multiplexing (CWDM/ DWDM) technology, and mmWave to allow transmission of baseband signal over long distance thus achieving large scale centralised base station deployment. It applies recent Data Centre Network technology to allow a low cost, high reliability, low latency and high bandwidth interconnect network in the BBU pool. It utilizes open platforms and real-time virtualization technology rooted in cloud computing to achieve dynamic shared resource allocation and support multi-vendor, multi-technology environments.

== Architecture overview ==
C-RAN architecture has the following characteristics that are distinct from other cellular architectures:

1. Large scale centralized deployment: Allows many RRHs to connect to a centralized BBU pool. The maximum distance can be 20km in fiber link for 4G (LTE/LTE-A) systems, and even longer distances (40~80km) for 3G (WCDMA/TD-SCDMA) and 2G (GSM/CDMA) systems.
2. Native support to Collaborative Radio technologies: Any BBU can talk with any other BBU within the BBU pool with very high bandwidth (10 Gbit/s and above) and low latency (10 μs level). This is enabled by the interconnection of BBUs in the pool. This is one major difference from BBU Hotelling, or base station Hotelling; in the latter case, the BBUs of different base stations are simply stacked together and have no direct link between them to allow physical layer co-ordination.
3. Real-time virtualization capability based on open platform: This is different from traditional base stations built on proprietary hardware, where the software and hardware are close-sourced and provided by single vendors. In contrast, a C-RAN BBU pool is built on open hardware, like x86/ARM CPU based servers, and interface cards that handle fiber links to RRHs and inter-connections in the pool. Real-time virtualization ensures that resources in the pool can be allocated dynamically to base station software stacks, say 4G/3G/2G function modules from different vendors, according to network load. However, to satisfy the strict timing requirements of wireless communication systems, the real-time performance for C-RAN is at the level of tens of microseconds, which is two orders of magnitude better than the millisecond level 'real-time' performance usually seen in Cloud Computing environments.

== Similar architecture and systems ==
KT, a telecom operator in the Republic of Korea, introduced a Cloud Computing Center (CCC) system in their 3G (WCDMA/HSPA) and 4G (LTE/LTE-A) network in 2011 and 2012. The concept of CCC is basically the same as C-RAN.

SK Telecom has also deployed Smart Cloud Access Network (SCAN) and Advanced-SCAN in their 4G (LTE/LTE-A) network in Korea no later than 2012.

In 2014, Airvana (now CommScope) introduced OneCell, a C-RAN-based small cell system designed for enterprises and public spaces.

== Competing architectures in cellular network evolution ==
=== All-in-one BTS ===
One major alternative solution that is addressing similar challenges of RAN, is the small size, all-in-one outdoor BTS. As a result of the achievements in the semiconductor industry, all the functionality of a BTS, including RF, baseband processing, MAC processing and package level processing, can now be implemented in a volume of <50 liters. This makes the system small and weatherproof, reduces the difficulty of BTS site choice and construction, eliminates the air conditioning requirement, and thus reduces operational costs.

However, because each BTS is still working on its own, it cannot readily make use of the collaboration algorithms to reduce the interference between neighboring BTSs. It is also relatively hard to upgrade or repair because the all-in-one BTS units are usually mounted near the antenna. More processing units in less-protected environments also implies a higher failure rate compared to C-RAN, which only has the RRU deployed outdoors.

The advantage of Cloud RAN lies in its ability to implement LTE-Advanced features such as Coordinated MultiPoint (CoMP) with very low latency between multiple radio heads. However, the economic benefit of improvements such as CoMP can be negated by the higher backhaul costs for some operators.

=== Small cell ===
The main competition between small cell and C-RAN occurs in two deployment scenarios: outdoor hotspot coverage and indoor coverage.

== Academic research and publications ==
C-RAN attracted academic research interest due to its native support of cooperative radio capability built into the C-RAN architecture which enables many advanced algorithms that were hard to implement in cellular networks, including Cooperative Multi-Point Transmission/Receiving, Network Coding, etc.

In October 2011, Wireless World Research Forum 27 was hosted in Germany, when China Mobile was invited to give a C-RAN presentation.

In August 2012, IEEE C-RAN 2012 workshop was hosted in Kunming, China.

CRC Press published a book, "Green Communications: Theoretical Fundamentals, Algorithms and Applications", and has as its 11th chapter: "C-RAN: A Green RAN Framework".

In December 2012, an IEEE GlobalCom 2012 conference, International Workshop on Cloud Based-Stations and Large-Scale Cooperative Communications, was hosted in California, USA.

The European Committee Frame Project 7 has sponsors and is currently addressing many problems related to cellular network architecture evolution. Many of these projects have taken C-RAN as one of the future cellular network architectures, like the Mobile Cloud Network project.

== Evolution to Open RAN (O-RAN) ==
C-RAN laid the groundwork for the Open Radio Access Network (O-RAN) paradigm, which further disaggregates the base station into standardised, open interfaces. Whereas C-RAN centralises baseband processing but may still rely on proprietary hardware and software, O-RAN builds on C-RAN principles by introducing open, standardised interfaces between the Centralised Unit (CU), Distributed Unit (DU), and Radio Unit (RU), governed by the O-RAN Alliance.

In a modern O-RAN deployment, the split architecture defines three functional units:

- O-CU (Open Centralised Unit): handles higher-layer protocols (PDCP and above) and can be deployed in a central data centre.
- O-DU (Open Distributed Unit): handles the lower-layer protocols (RLC, MAC, and the upper physical layer) and is typically deployed at or near the base station site.
- O-RU (Open Radio Unit): the radio front-end handling the lower physical layer and RF functions.

This disaggregation enables multi-vendor interoperability, reducing dependence on a single equipment supplier.

=== Global deployments ===
Several major operators have deployed or piloted C-RAN and O-RAN infrastructure:

- Rakuten Mobile (Japan) launched commercial 4G and 5G services based entirely on open RAN architecture using multiple radio vendors, becoming one of the first operators to do so at scale.
- Vodafone (UK) began deploying Open RAN technology across 2,500 sites in Southwest England and Wales, marking the first scaled O-RAN deployment in Europe.
- Reliance Jio (India) built its 5G network based on open RAN technology, while Airtel partnered with Mavenir for 5G Open RAN deployments initially across 2,300 sites, to be scaled to 10,000 sites.
- AT&T (United States) announced a large-scale Open RAN deal with Ericsson, Dell, Fujitsu, and Intel in late 2023 to modernise its network.
- China Mobile conducted pre-commercial O-RAN demonstrations in 2023, including mixed-vendor O-RAN integration with Lenovo and other partners.

== Security considerations ==
The shift to C-RAN and O-RAN introduces specific security challenges that differ from traditional, monolithic base station architectures.

=== Increased attack surface ===
By disaggregating the RAN into software-based components running on general-purpose servers, C-RAN and O-RAN inherit vulnerabilities common to cloud computing environments. The use of standard web protocols, APIs, and containerised network functions expands the potential attack surface. Containers used in the RAN shift security responsibilities toward virtual machines and cloud-native security mechanisms.

=== Multi-vendor risks ===
Multi-vendor interoperability, while a key goal of O-RAN, introduces risks from supply chain attacks and software vulnerabilities in third-party components. Each additional interface between vendors (such as the O1, E2, and A1 interfaces defined by the O-RAN Alliance) represents a potential point of exploitation if not properly secured.

=== Fronthaul security ===
The fronthaul link — the connection between the BBU pool (or DU) and Remote Radio Heads (RRHs/RUs) — relies heavily on fibre optic transport, typically using the CPRI or eCPRI standard. If this fronthaul link is physically or logically compromised, it can affect the integrity and confidentiality of radio signals. Regulatory bodies such as GSMA and 3GPP provide guidelines for securing 5G RAN deployments, including the fronthaul segment.

=== US Government assessment ===
The US National Telecommunications and Information Administration (NTIA) published a comprehensive Open RAN Security Report assessing threats in the O-RAN cloud (O-Cloud) layer, rating a significant portion of identified security threats as "High" severity. The report noted that while cloud computing risks are not entirely new to mobile network operators, moving essential RAN resources to cloud environments creates new management challenges.

=== Quad-backed Pacific deployment ===
In 2026, the Quad grouping (the United States, Australia, India, and Japan) announced support for the first commercial Open RAN deployment in the Pacific Islands region, building on an earlier US$20 million pilot project launched in 2023. The network was expected to become operational in early 2027.
