= Fronthaul =

The fronthaul portion of a C-RAN (Cloud Radio Access Network) telecommunications architecture comprises the intermediate links between the centralized radio controllers and the radio heads (or masts) at the "edge" of a cellular network. In recent years fronthaul is becoming more essential as 5G becomes more mainstream.

In general it is coincident with the backhaul network, but subtly different. Technically in a C-RAN the backhaul data is only decoded from the fronthaul network at the centralised controllers, from where it is then transferred to the core network.

It comprises dedicated fibers carrying data in the CPRI or OBSAI format. This fiber network is either owned or leased by the mobile network operator. In the UK for example BT Openreach owns a majority of the fiber network to radio masts. There are proposals to modify Ethernet to make it more suitable for the Fronthaul network.

Recently, a novel wireless fronthaul solution has been proposed for ultra-dense small cell deployment where networked flying platforms (NFPs) such UAVs, drones, tethered balloon and high-altitude/medium-altitude/low-altitude platforms carrying FSO transceivers have been introduced as aerial hubs to aggregate the small cell traffic and offer connectivity to the core network.
