= IEEE 1914.1 =

Standard for packet-based fronthaul transport networks

IEEE 1914.1 is a standard for packet-based fronthaul transport networks developed under IEEE 1914 Next Generation Fronthaul Interface – NGFI (xhaul) Working Group. NGFI (xhaul) working group is sponsored by IEEE Communications Society/Standards Development Board (COM/SDB). IEEE 1914.1 standardizes architecture and requirements for mobile fronthaul network – spanning between cell sites and centralized baseband locations in Centralized, Collaborative, Cloud and Clean Radio Access Network C-RAN.

== Founding members ==
The IEEE 1914.1 project was co-founded by AT&T, China Mobile, SK Telecom, Telecom Italia, Alcatel-Lucent, Broadcom and Intel.

== Introduction ==
Base station architecture evolved from all-in-one base stations, through Base-Band Units (BBUs) and Remote Radio Heads (RRH), to C-RAN architectures where equipment located at the cell sites Remote Unit (RU) or RU + Distributed Unit (DU) connects via fronthaul network to centralized baseband locations – Central Unit (CU).

On the road towards future 5G networks, it is clear that an efficient transport network is necessary and traditional fronthaul solutions are not suitable for 5G evolution. The current mobile networks comprise multiple separate network domains. This creates serious challenges for network operators, such as low scalability, inflexible management and control solutions, slow and difficult upgrades, poor resource utilization, and high cost.

IEEE 1914.1 project was established to facilitate the implementation of key 5G technologies especially Cloud-RAN and Massive multiple-input-multiple-output (MIMO) from fronthaul networking perspective, and describe the required networking architecture to enable migration to 5G and C-RAN solutions.

== Goals ==
The Fronthaul Packet Transport standard enables the implementation of critical 5G technologies, such as massive MIMO, Coordinated Multipoint (CoMP) transmission and reception, and scalable Centralized/Virtual Radio Access Network (C-RAN) functions.

This standard simplifies network design and operation, increases network flexibility and resource utilization, and lowers cost by leveraging existing, mature Ethernet-based solutions for vital functions, such as quality of service, synchronization, and data security.

The fronthaul architecture provides unified management and control solution, common networking protocols, and universal network elements, thus facilitating migration to future C-RAN/V-RAN mobile networks.

== Scope ==
This standard specifies:

1. Architecture for the transport of mobile fronthaul traffic (e.g., Ethernet-based), including deployment scenarios, user data traffic, and management and control plane traffic.
2. Requirements and definitions for the fronthaul networks, including data rates, timing and synchronization, network slicing, and quality of service.

The standard also analyzes functional partitioning schemes between RRUs and BBUs that improve fronthaul link efficiency and interoperability on the transport level, and that facilitate the realization of cooperative radio functions, such as massive MIMO operational modes, CoMP transmission and reception.

== Members ==
The working group consists of major mobile network operators like AT&T, China Mobile and Verizon, and telecom vendors like Anritsu, Broadcom, Comcores, CommScope, Fiberhome, Fujitsu, Intel, IP light, Microsemi, NEC, Oticon, SM Optics, and Xilinx, as well as academia. Complete list of members is available here.

== Timeline ==
Key milestones are:

- Project Authorization Request (PAR) Date: 14 October 2015
- PAR Approval Date: 5 February 2016
- PAR Expiration Date: 31 December 2020
- Standardised Date: 21 April 2020

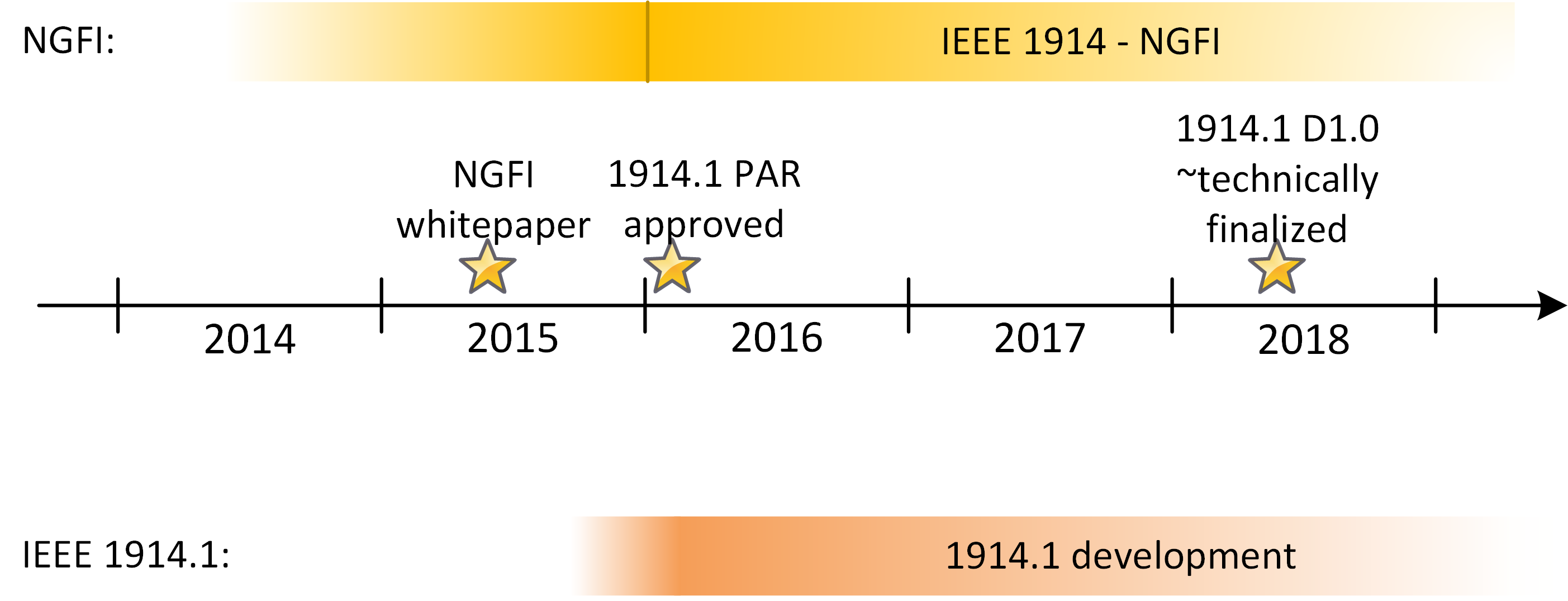
Timeline of IEEE 1914.1. Based on:
