= 6G =

Proposed sixth-generation mobile telecommunications technology

3GPP 6G logo

6G is the proposed and upcoming sixth generation of the mobile communications technology and the planned successor to 5G (ITU-R IMT-2020). As of 2026, development is coordinated by the International Telecommunication Union (ITU-R) within its IMT-2030 framework, defined in Recommendation ITU-R M.2160-0.

ITU-R oversees related work by 3GPP and ETSI, together with the Next Generation Mobile Networks (NGMN) Alliance. 3GPP is finalizing Release 18 for 5G Advanced and preparing Release 19 for early 6G research. IMT-2030 defines performance targets for future mobile systems and tracks 6G standardization.

Research and testing are in progress at major equipment vendors, operators, and institutes. Companies including Ericsson, Nokia, Huawei, Samsung, LG, Apple, NTT Docomo, Airtel, and Jio have announced 6G programs. Governments in North America, Europe, and Asia are funding national 6G initiatives through the EU, the United States, Russia, China, India, Japan, and South Korea.

6G aims to achieve higher data rates, lower latency, and greater energy efficiency than 5G. Planned advances include new air interface designs, improved coding and modulation, and reconfigurable intelligent surfaces. Research also explores integration with satellite, Wi-Fi, and non-terrestrial networks, as well as distributed edge computing for AR, VR, and AI applications.

Machine learning and AI are expected to help manage networks, allocate spectrum, and optimize services.

According to the NGMN Alliance, 6G development should focus on demonstrable user needs and avoid unnecessary replacement of existing 5G radio access network equipment. Analysts note that 5G revenue growth has been slower than predicted, leading to a cautious approach to 6G investment. Commercial deployment of 6G is anticipated in the early 2030s, following standardization milestones later in the 2020s.

== Expectations ==
6G networks are expected to be developed and released by the early 2030s. The largest number of 6G patents have been filed in China.

=== Features ===
Academic publications since the early 2020s have been conceptualizing 6G and new features that may be included. Artificial intelligence is included in many predictions, from 6G supporting AI infrastructure to "AI designing and optimizing 6G architectures, protocols, and operations." Another study in Nature Electronics looks to provide a framework for 6G research, stating, "We suggest that human-centric mobile communications will still be the most important application of 6G and the 6G network should be human-centric. Thus, high security, secrecy and privacy should be key features of 6G and should be given particular attention by the wireless research community."

=== Transmission ===
The frequency bands for 6G are undetermined. Initially, Terahertz was considered an important band for 6G, as indicated by the Institute of Electrical and Electronics Engineers, which stated that "Frequencies from 100 GHz to 3 THz are promising bands for the next generation of wireless communication systems because of the wide swaths of unused and unexplored spectrum."

One of the challenges in supporting the required high transmission speeds will be the limitation of energy consumption and associated thermal protection in the electronic circuits.

As of now, mid bands are being considered by WRC for 6G/IMT-2030.

=== Coverage ===
In June 2021, according to Samsung's white paper, using Sub-THz 6G spectrum, their indoor data rate was successful for 6 Gbit/s at 15 meters distance. The following year, Samsung reported 12 Gbit/s at 30 meters distance and 2.3 Gbit/s at 120 meters distance.

In September 2023, LG successfully tested 6 Gbit/s transmission and reception at 500 meters distance outdoor.

== Terahertz and millimeter-wave research ==
Research into terahertz radiation (300–3,000 GHz) and millimeter-wave frequencies (30–300 GHz) explores their potential for 6G mobile networks. These high frequencies can support large data rates but are easily blocked by obstacles. Unlike the microwave bands (2–30 GHz) used in 5G and Wi-Fi, and the lower-frequency radio waves used in 1G–4G, their commercial feasibility remains uncertain, as 5G millimeter-wave use is limited by cost.

=== Industry initiatives ===
In 2020, the Alliance for Telecommunications Industry Solutions (ATIS) launched the Next G Alliance, a group including AT&T, Ericsson, Telus, Verizon, T-Mobile, Microsoft, and Samsung. The alliance aims to advance North American 6G research.

=== Experimental studies ===
In 2022, researchers from Purple Mountain Laboratories, a state-affiliated institute in Nanjing, China, reported a 206.25 Gbit/s data rate in laboratory tests using the terahertz band. The team said the results may support future 6G research.

Also in 2022, another Chinese research group reported a data transmission rate of 1 Tbit/s over 1 km using vortex millimeter-wave transmission, a technique that uses radio waves shaped to spiral as they travel. The work built on earlier European studies from the 1990s. Vortex waves weaken as they expand with distance. The researchers used a custom transmitter and receiver to focus and decode multiple rotating wave modes.

In 2023, Nagoya University in Japan created three-dimensional waveguide structures made of superconducting niobium for communication in the 100 GHz range. The superconducting design reduced signal loss from absorption and radiation and was proposed for high-frequency 6G transmission.

Research on terahertz and millimeter-wave communication continues worldwide as part of global efforts to develop future wireless standards.

== Experimental satellites ==
In November 2020, China launched a Long March 6 vehicle that carried a satellite testing components for potential 6G communication. Chinese state media described it as "the world's first 6G satellite", a claim not independently verified. The mission studied terahertz-band transmission and other 6G-related technologies.

== Geopolitics ==
Geopolitical competition during the rollout of 5G has continued to shape the development of 6G. During that time, China reduced participation by foreign vendors and relied more on domestic suppliers such as Huawei and ZTE. Several Western countries later restricted Huawei and ZTE after government investigations accused Chinese firms of cyber-espionage and intellectual-property theft. These developments affected early 6G planning and global supply chains.

Analysts have suggested that such divisions could lead to a split in 6G standards. Analysts also expect competition in international standards bodies to grow.

A joint statement issued in February 2024 by the United States, Australia, Canada, Czech Republic, Finland, France, Japan, South Korea, Sweden, and the United Kingdom endorsed shared 6G principles for open, global, and secure connectivity.

Governments in several countries, including China and India, have made 6G a national priority. The technology appears in China's Fourteenth Five-Year Plan. India's 6G direction is defined by the Bharat 6G Vision document, published in 2023.

Governments have also promoted varied technology suppliers. Many support the Open RAN model, which lets hardware and software from different suppliers work together without vendor control.

Australia's telecommunications strategy includes early 6G planning. In March 2025, Telstra announced that 6G is expected in the 2030s, with $800 million set aside to improve existing infrastructure over four years.

== Internet of Things ==
6G wireless communication networks are envisioned to revolutionize customer services and applications via the IoT (Internet of Things) toward a future of fully intelligent and autonomous systems. IoT connects sensor devices and networks to enable communication among people, physical objects, and equipment across a wide range of contexts. 6G will also use Backscatter Communication for Ambient IoT devices.

Preceded by 5G	Mobile telephony generations In development	Standard in development
