= India Centre for Lab Grown Diamond =

Indian research center

India Centre for Lab Grown Diamond (InCent-LGD) is a research and development centre established by the Indian Institute of Technology Madras (IITM) in collaboration with the Ministry of Commerce and Industry, India. The centre was established in February 2023 with the aim of developing indigenous technologies for diamond growth and exploring the diverse applications of lab-grown diamonds beyond jewellery, particularly in the field of electronics.

== Objectives ==
- To develop cutting-edge technology for the growth of high-quality lab-grown diamonds.
- To explore the semiconducting properties of doped diamonds for applications in high-speed electronic devices and next-generation technologies like 5G/6G communication.
- To investigate the use of diamonds in thermal management systems for improved cooling and heat dissipation.
- To develop diamond-based tools for enhanced machine tool life and performance.
- To explore the potential of diamonds in magnetometry and quantum computing.

== Research Groups ==
InCent-LGD has three core research groups dedicated to different aspects of lab-grown diamond technology:

- High Pressure High Temperature (HPHT) Group: This group focuses on the HPHT method of diamond growth, which simulates the natural diamond formation process by subjecting carbon to high pressure and high temperature.
- Microwave Plasma-enhanced Chemical Vapour Deposition (MPCVD) Group: This group explores the MPCVD method, where a diamond film is grown on a substrate from a carbon-containing gaseous plasma.
- Solid-State Microwave Generators (SSMG) Group: This group develops and optimizes SSMGs, which are crucial components for generating the microwave plasma needed for MPCVD diamond growth.
