= Y.3172 =

ITU-T recommendation

- Architectural framework for machine learning in future networks including IMT-2020
- Status: In force
- Year started: 2019
- Latest version: (06/19); June 2019
- Organization: ITU-T
- Committee: ITU-T Study Group 13
- Related standards: Y.3173, Y.3174, Y.3176, Y.3179, Y.3181
- Domain: machine learning, 5G
- License: Freely available
- Website: www.itu.int/rec/T-REC-Y.3172

Y.3172 is an ITU-T Recommendation specifying an architecture for machine learning in future networks including 5G (IMT-2020). The architecture describes a machine learning pipeline in the context of telecommunication networks that involves the training of machine learning models, and also the deployment using methods such as containers and orchestration.

A set of architectural requirements and specific architectural components needed to satisfy these requirements are presented. This includes i.a., machine learning pipeline as well as machine learning management and orchestration functionalities. Additionally, the standard describes the integration of such components into future networks including IMT-2020 as well as guidelines for applying this architectural framework in a variety of technology-specific underlying networks.

The Recommendation Y.3173 builds upon Y.3172 by specifying a framework for evaluation intelligence levels of future networks.

== Machine Learning pipeline ==
- 'SRC' (source): This node is the source of data that can be used as input to the ML pipeline.
- 'C' (collector): This node is responsible for collecting data from one or more SRC nodes.
- 'PP' (preprocessor): This node is responsible for cleaning data, aggregating data or performing any other preprocessing needed for the data to be in a suitable form so that the ML model can consume it.
- 'M' (model): This is a machine learning model, in a form which is usable in a machine learning pipeline.
- 'P' (policy): This node enables the application of policies to the output of the model node.
- 'D' (distributor): This node is responsible for identifying the SINK(s) and distributing the output of the M node to the corresponding SINK nodes.
- 'SINK': This node is the target of the ML output on which it takes action.

== History ==
At the 2017 AI for Good summit the idea for a Focus Group on Machine Learning for 5G (FG-ML5G) arose, similar to the way the summit gave rise the ITU-WHO Focus Group on Artificial Intelligence for Health. The Focus Group finalized the standard in May 2019 and submitted it to ITU-T Study Group 13 (its parent body) for adoption as an ITU-T Recommendation, which happened in June 2019.

Based on Y.3172 ITU launched an AI/ML 5G Challenge, on implementing this architecture.
