= AirHop Communications =

- Type: Private
- Industry: Mobile Wireless Communications
- Founded: 2007
- Headquarters: San Diego, CA
- Area served: Worldwide
- Products: List: eSON software for 3G/4G wireless small cell basestations
- Website: airhopai.com

AirHop Communications is a privately funded American corporation based in San Diego, CA. AirHop develops radio access network (RAN) software that addresses the installation, operation and performance challenges of multi-layer deployments of small cells in 3G and 4G networks. AirHop's customers are typically base station equipment vendors for wireless network operators.

== Technology ==
AirHop holds 20 patent applications for its eSON™ self-organizing network (SON) software. eSON enables carriers to build a 3G or 4G LTE heterogeneous network (“het-net”) to augment existing macro base stations. Many carriers are using small cells and self-organizing networks to fill in gaps in 3G and 4G networks due to signal attenuation and add capacity.

The 3rd Generation Partnership Project (3GPP) defined a SON specification to allow base stations to discover each other when inserted into a network and to adjust their radio frequency (RF) signal strength to avoid overlap and interference. AirHop was founded to extend this technology beyond initial network start-up to also provide ongoing interference management and spectrum reuse. This gives carriers the ability to both initialize the network and ongoing RAN intelligence to adjust signal levels as small cells come online and overlap with each other. eSON also optimizes spectrum reuse (spectral efficiency), enabling macrocells and small cells to share the same spectrum without interference (communication).

== History ==
AirHop was founded in 2007 by three engineers in charge of 3G research and development at Texas Instruments. They foresaw that the present wireless network infrastructure would have to change as part of the move to 4G technologies to support mobile broadband. They left TI in October 2007 to begin developing SON software.

The company announced a $1 million investment in September 2009 and added several wireless industry executives to its management team. AirHop showcased the first of its 3GPP Long Term Evolution (LTE) solutions by running an HD video transmission demonstration on Texas Instruments’ TCI1648x DSP at CTIA – The Wireless Association in March 2009. In November 2009, the company announced its first product, eSON, and in February 2010, AirHop partnered with Continuous Computing and picoChip at Mobile World Congress 2010 to demonstrate a reference design for eSON based on picoChip's picoXcell High Speed Packet Access (HSPA) platform. In October 2010, AirHop and picoChip announced the integration of eSON with picoChip's 3G picoXcell PC302 evolved HSPA (HSPA+) platform. AirHop and Argela demonstrated eSON on a commercial 3G femtocell at Mobile World Congress in February 2011 and its first 4G/LTE customer was announced in May with the introduction of Wazco's Metrostorm metrocell.

== Industry recognition ==
AirHop has received industry recognition for its technology. The company was named to Light Reading Mobile's list of Top Ten Startups to Watch in 2011, was named a FierceWireless Fierce 15 Top Wireless Company for 2010 and earned the Telecom Council of Silicon Valley SPIFFY Award for Most Disruptive Technology in 2011.
