= Y.3173 =

ITU-T recommendation

- Framework for evaluating intelligence levels of future networks including IMT-2020
- Status: In force
- Year started: 2019
- Latest version: (02/20); February 2020
- Organization: ITU-T
- Committee: ITU-T Study Group 13, Focus Group on Machine Learning in 5G
- Base standards: Y.3172
- Related standards: Y.3176, Y.3181
- Domain: machine learning, 5G
- License: Freely available
- Website: www.itu.int/rec/T-REC-Y.3173

Y.3173 is an ITU-T Recommendation building upon Y.3172 specifying a framework for evaluation intelligence levels of future networks such as 5G (IMT-2020). This includes:

- Development trend of network intelligence
- Methods for evaluating network intelligence levels
- Architectural view for evaluating network intelligence levels

The standard addresses issue in Operation, Administration and Maintenance (OAM) of IMT-2020 networks such as:

- diversified network deployment scenarios are
- diversified terminals, such as in Internet of things (IoT)
- manual decision-making mechanisms
- mechanisms analysing large amounts of network
- network connectivity among UEs
- decoupling of software from the hardware in networks
- transition towards a service-based intelligent network

Network intelligence is defined as:

Level of application of automation capabilities including those enabled by the integration of artificial intelligence techniques in the network.
