= RRU =

RRU may refer to:

- Rapid response unit, a specialized medical response team
- Rashtriya Raksha University, National security and Police university of India
- Remote radio unit, part of a wireless network
- Ridge Racer Unbounded, a racing video game from Microsoft
- Royal Roads University, a Canadian public university
