= IEEE 802.1ag =

Networking standard

IEEE 802.1ag is an amendment to the IEEE 802.1Q networking standard which introduces Connectivity Fault Management (CFM). This defines protocols and practices for the operations, administration, and maintenance (OAM) of paths through 802.1 bridges and local area networks (LANs). The final version was approved by the IEEE in 2007.

IEEE 802.1ag is a subset of the earlier ITU-T Recommendation Y.1731, which additionally addresses performance monitoring.

The standard:

- Defines maintenance domains, their constituent maintenance points, and the managed objects required to create and administer them
- Defines the relationship between maintenance domains and the services offered by VLAN-aware bridges and provider bridges
- Describes the protocols and procedures used by maintenance points to maintain and diagnose connectivity faults within a maintenance domain;
- Provides means for future expansion of the capabilities of maintenance points and their protocols

== Definitions ==
The document defines various terms:

Maintenance Domain (MD)
Maintenance Domains are management space on a network, typically owned and operated by a single entity. MDs are configured with Names and Levels, where the eight levels range from 0 to 7. A hierarchical relationship exists between domains based on levels. The larger the domain, the higher the level value. Recommended values of levels are as follows:

- Customer Domain: Largest (e.g., 7)
- Provider Domain: In between (e.g., 3)
- Operator Domain: Smallest (e.g., 1)

CFM MD Levels Example

Maintenance Association (MA)
Defined as a "set of MEPs, all of which are configured with the same MAID (Maintenance Association Identifier) and MD Level, each of which is configured with a MEPID unique within that MAID and MD Level, and all of which are configured with the complete list of MEPIDs."

Maintenance association End Point (MEP)
Points at the edge of the domain, define the boundary for the domain. A MEP sends and receives CFM frames through the relay function, drops all CFM frames of its level or lower that come from the wire side.

Maintenance domain Intermediate Point (MIP)
Points internal to a domain, not at the boundary. CFM frames received from MEPs and other MIPs are cataloged and forwarded, all CFM frames at a lower level are stopped and dropped. MIPs are passive points, respond only when triggered by CFM trace route and loop-back messages.

== CFM Protocols ==
IEEE 802.1ag Ethernet CFM (Connectivity Fault Management) protocols comprise three protocols that work together to help administrators debug Ethernet networks. They are:

Continuity Check Protocol (CCP)
"Heartbeating" messages for CFM. The Continuity Check Message (CCM) provides a means to detect connectivity failures in an MA. CCMs are multicast messages. CCMs are confined to a domain (MD). These messages are unidirectional and do not solicit a response. Each MEP transmits a periodic multicast Continuity Check Message inward towards the other MEPs.

Link Trace (LT)
Link Trace messages otherwise known as Mac Trace Route are Multicast frames that a MEP transmits to track the path (hop-by-hop) to a destination MEP which is similar in concept to User Datagram Protocol (UDP) Trace Route. Each receiving MEP sends a Trace Route Reply directly to the Originating MEP, and regenerates the Trace Route Message.

Loop-back (LB)
Loop-back messages otherwise known as MAC ping are Unicast frames that a MEP transmits, they are similar in concept to an Internet Control Message Protocol (ICMP) Echo (Ping) messages, sending Loopback to successive MIPs can determine the location of a fault. Sending a high volume of Loopback Messages can test bandwidth, reliability, or jitter of a service, which is similar to flood ping. A MEP can send a Loopback to any MEP or MIP in the service. Unlike CCMs, Loop back messages are administratively initiated and stopped.

== Y.1731 ==
ITU-T Y.1731 additionally supports the following:

- Ethernet alarm indication signal (ETH-AIS)
- Ethernet remote defect indication (ETH-RDI)
- Ethernet locked signal (ETH-LCK)
- Ethernet test signal (ETH-Test)
- Ethernet automatic protection switching (ETH-APS)
- Ethernet maintenance communication channel (ETH-MCC)
- Ethernet experimental OAM (ETH-EXP)
- Ethernet vendor-specific OAM (ETH-VSP)
- Ethernet client signal fail (ETH-CSF)
- Ethernet bandwidth notification (ETH-BN)
- Ethernet expected defect function (ETH-ED)
- Frame loss measurement (ETH-LM)
- Frame delay measurement (ETH-DM)
- Delay measurement message (DMM)
- Loss measurement message (LMM)
