= NGMN =

NGMN may refer to:

- the Next Generation Mobile Networks Alliance
- next generation mobile networks in a broader sense, usually for the 4th generation 4G of mobile technology that follows after the 3G generation of standards
- ICAO code for Makin Airport, Makin (islands), (IATA code MTK)
