= ITU-T Study Group 13 =

Standardization body focused on multimedia standards

- Abbreviation: SG13
- Formation: 1997
- Type: Standards organization
- Purpose: Networks, Technologies and Infrastructures
- Location: Geneva, Switzerland
- Region served: Worldwide
- Chairman: Kazunori Tanikawa
- Key people: Seizo Onoe
- Parent organization: World Telecommunication Standardization Assembly (ITU-T)
- Affiliations: ITU-T Study Group 17, ISO/IEC JTC 1
- Website: www.itu.int/go/tsg13

The ITU-T Study Group 13 (SG13) is a statutory group of the ITU Telecommunication Standardization Sector (ITU-T) concerned with future networks and emerging network technologies, infrastructure and cloud computing, including the networking aspects of mobile telecommunications. Examples include: Y.1564, Y.1731, etc.. Recent work includes a series of standards on using machine learning in networking, such as Y.3172, Y.3173, Y.3176, and Y.3181.

Administratively, SG13 is a statutory meeting of the World Telecommunication Standardization Assembly (WTSA), which creates the ITU-T Study Groups and appoints their management teams. The secretariat is provided by the Telecommunication Standardization Bureau (under Director Seizo Onoe).
