= Y.3176 =

ITU-T Recommendation

- Machine learning marketplace integration in future networks including IMT2020
- Status: In force
- Year started: 2020
- Latest version: (10/20); October 2020
- Organization: ITU-T
- Committee: ITU-T Study Group 13
- Base standards: Y.3172, Y.3173, Y.3181
- Domain: machine learning, 5G
- License: Freely available
- Website: www.itu.int/rec/T-REC-Y.3176

Y.3176 is an ITU-T Recommendation, building upon Y.3172 and Y.3173, specifying a framework for evaluation intelligence levels of future networks such as 5G (IMT-2020).

This Recommendation provides high-level requirements and the architecture for integrating ML marketplaces in future networks including IMT-2020. Based on these requirements, the architecture for the integration of ML marketplaces is described taking into account the architectural framework in Y.3172 as a basis.

Keywords architecture, federation, future networks, IMT-2020, life-cycle, machine learning, management, marketplace, model, network functions, requirements
