= Networked flying platform =

Networked flying platforms (NFPs) are unmanned flying platforms of various types including unmanned aerial vehicles (UAVs), drones, tethered balloon and high-altitude/medium-altitude/low-altitude platforms (HAPs/MAPs/LAPs) carrying RF/mmWave/FSO payload (transceivers) along with an extended battery life capabilities, and are floating or moving in the air at a quasi-stationary positions with the ability to move horizontally and vertically to offer 5G and beyond 5G (B5G) cellular networks and network support services.

== Deployment configurations ==
There are following two possible NFPs deployment configurations:

- Deployment configuration 1: NFPs are expected to complement the conventional cellular networks to further enhance the wireless capacity, expand the coverage and improve the network reliability for temporary events, where there is a high density of mobile users or small cells in a limited/hard to reach area or in a remote region where infrastructure is not available and expensive to deploy, e.g., sports events and concert gatherings
- Deployment configuration 2: NFPs can be deployed for unexpected scenarios, such as in emergency situations to support disaster relief activities and to enable communications when conventional cellular networks are either damaged or congested. In addition, owing to their mobility, NFPs are expected to deploy quickly and efficiently to support cellular networks, enhance network quality of service (QoS) and improve network resilience under emergency scenarios

NFPs can be manually (non-autonomously) controlled but mainly designed for autonomous pre-determined flights. NFPs can either operate in a single NFP mode where NFPs do not cooperate with other NFPs in the network, if exists or a swarm of NFPs where multiple interconnected NFPs cooperate, collaborate and perform the network mission autonomously with one of the NFPs designated as mother-NFP
