= 5G NR =

Radio access technology for 5G networks

5G NR (5G New Radio) is a radio access technology that was developed by the 3rd Generation Partnership Project (3GPP) for the 5G (fifth generation) mobile network. It was designed to be the global standard for the air interface of 5G networks and operates across both sub-6 GHz (FR1) and millimeter-wave (FR2) frequency bands. Standardized initially in 3GPP Release 15, the specification builds upon the orthogonal frequency-division multiplexing (OFDM) waveform principles established in the 4G LTE standard while introducing scalable numerology, advanced beamforming, and flexible slot-based frame structures to support enhanced mobile broadband, ultra-reliable low-latency communication, and massive machine-type communications.

The 3GPP specification 38 series provides the technical details behind 5G NR, the successor of LTE.

The study of 5G NR within 3GPP started in 2015, and the first specification was made available by the end of 2017. While the 3GPP standardization process was ongoing, the industry had already begun efforts to implement infrastructure compliant with the draft standard, with the first large-scale commercial launch of 5G NR having occurred in the end of 2018. Since 2019, many operators have deployed 5G NR networks and handset manufacturers have developed 5G NR enabled handsets.

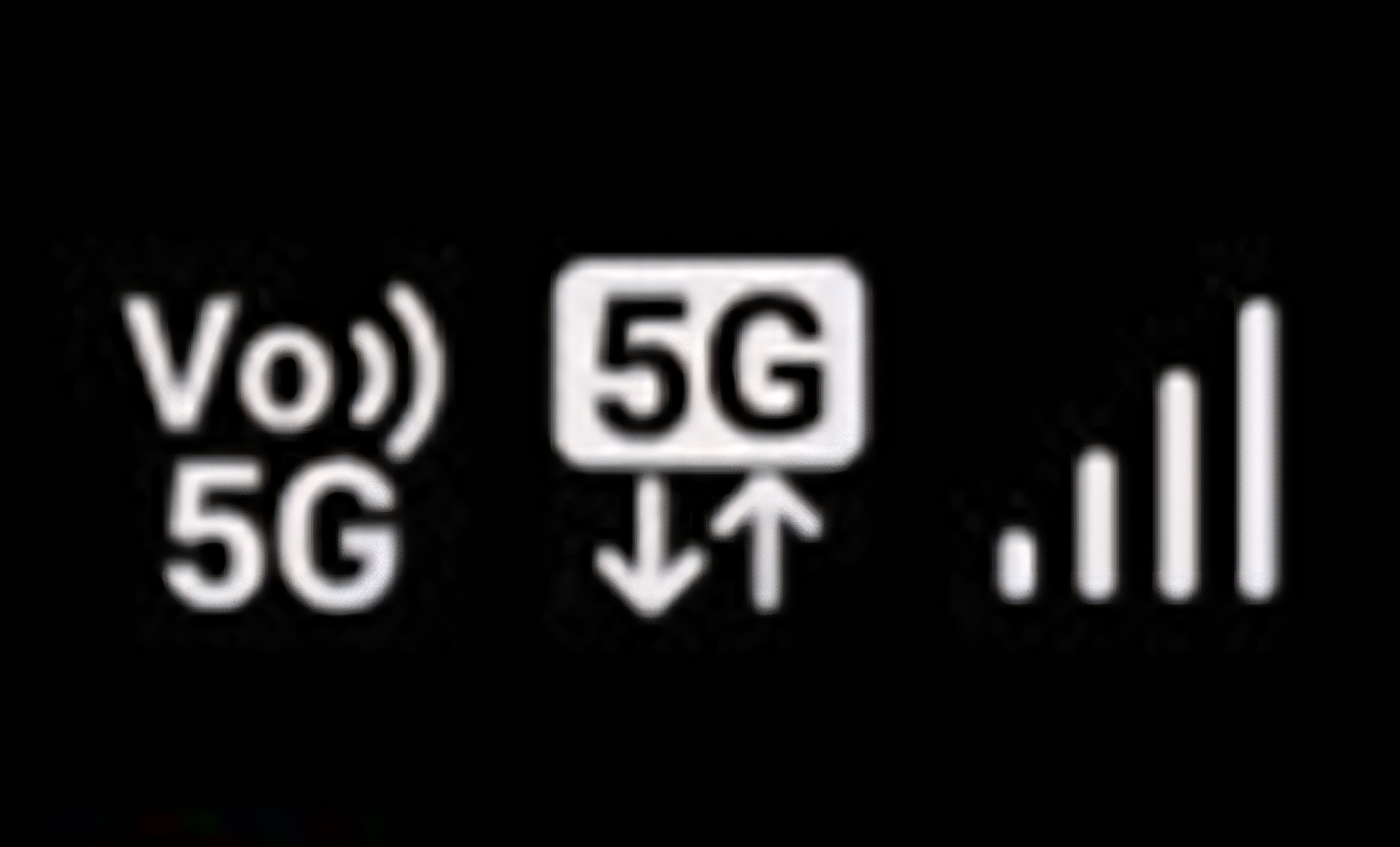
5G NR signal indicator on Samsung Galaxy smartphones

== Frequency bands ==
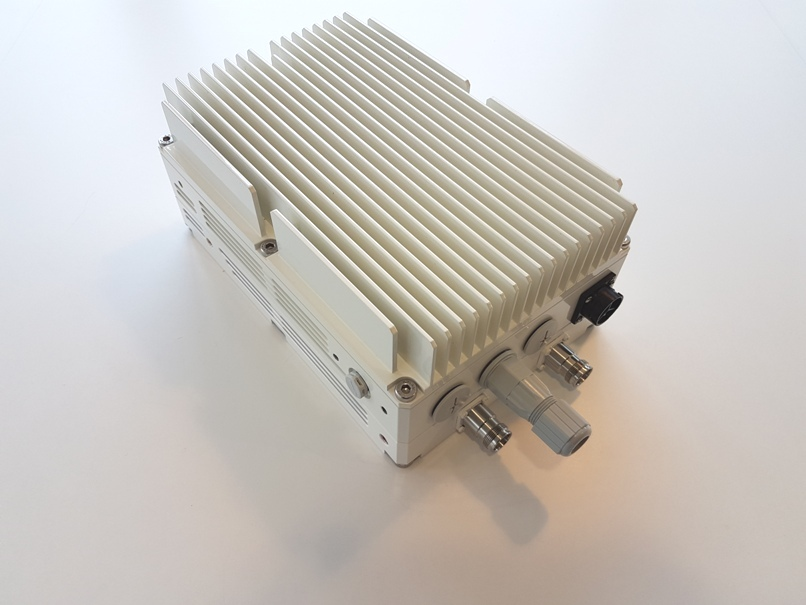
CableFree 5G Radio (RRH) with 2x2 MIMO, 2x20W RF power and CPRI fibre interface, can be connected to a 5G gNodeB or gNB which can have the form of an x86 server

5G NR uses frequency bands in two broad frequency ranges:

1. Frequency Range 1 (FR1), for bands within 410 MHz – 7,125 MHz
2. Frequency Range 2 (FR2), for bands within 24,250 MHz – 71,000 MHz

== gNodeB ==
gNodeB or gNb (Next Generation Node B) means a 5G base station. It transmits radio data to and receives radio data from user equipment. Its coverage area is called a cell. The gNodeB may be a tower.

A "Non-Standalone" (NSA) gNodeB is built on an existing LTE (4G) base station (eNodeB or eNB).

== Network deployments ==
Ooredoo was the first carrier to launch a commercial 5G NR network, in May 2018 in Qatar. Other carriers around the world have been following suit.

== Development ==
In 2018, 3GPP published Release 15, which includes what is described as "Phase 1" standardization for 5G NR. The timeline for Release 16, which will be "5G phase 2", follows a freeze date of March 2020 and a completion date of June 2020, Release 17 was originally scheduled for delivery in September 2021. but, because of the COVID-19 pandemic, it was rescheduled for June 2022.

Release 18 work has started in 3GPP. Rel.18 is referred to as "NR Advanced" signifying another milestone in wireless communication systems. NR Advanced will include features such as eXtended Reality (XR), AI/ML studies, and Mobility enhancements. Mobility is in the core of 3GPP technology and has so far been handled on Layer 3 (RRC), now, in Rel-18 the work on mobility is to introduce lower layer triggered mobility.

== Deployment modes ==
Initial 5G NR launches will depend on existing LTE infrastructure in non-standalone (NSA) mode, before maturation of the standalone (SA) mode with the 5G core network. Additionally, the spectrum can be dynamically shared between LTE and 5G NR.

=== Dynamic spectrum sharing ===
To make better use of existing assets, carriers may opt to dynamically share it between LTE and 5G NR. The spectrum is multiplexed over time between both generations of mobile networks depending on user demand, while still using the LTE network for control functions. Dynamic spectrum sharing (DSS) may be deployed on existing LTE equipment as long as it is compatible with 5G NR. Only the 5G NR terminal needs to be compatible with DSS.

=== Non-standalone mode ===
The non-standalone (NSA) mode of 5G NR refers to an option of 5G NR deployment that depends on the control plane of an existing LTE network for control functions, while 5G NR is exclusively focused on the user plane. This is reported to speed up 5G adoption, however some operators and vendors have criticized prioritizing the introduction of 5G NR NSA on the grounds that it could hinder the implementation of the standalone mode of the network. It uses the same core network as a 4G network, but with upgraded radio equipment.

=== Standalone mode ===
The standalone (SA) mode of 5G NR refers to using 5G cells for both signalling and information transfer, essentially a 5G network without any legacy 4G infrastructure. It includes the new 5G Packet Core architecture instead of relying on the 4G Evolved Packet Core, to allow the deployment of 5G without the LTE network. It is expected to have lower cost, better efficiency, and to assist development of new use cases. However, initial deployment might see slower speed than existing network due to the allocation of spectrum. It uses a new core network dedicated to 5G.

== Numerology (sub-carrier spacing) ==
5G NR supports seven subcarrier spacings:

| Sub-Carrier Spacing (kHz) | Slot duration (ms) | Frequency Bands | Notes |
|---|---|---|---|
| 15 | 1 | FR1 | Same as LTE |
| 30 | 0.5 | FR1 | |
| 60 | 0.25 | FR1 and FR2 | Both normal cyclic prefix (CP) and extended CP may be used with 60 kHz subcarrier spacing |
| 120 | 0.125 | FR2 | |
| 240 | 0.0625 | FR2 | This is only possible for search and measurement purposes, using the Synchronization Signal Block (SSB) |
| 480 | 0.03125 | FR2 | |
| 960 | 0.01565 | FR2 | |

The length of the cyclic prefix is inversely proportional to the subcarrier spacing. It is 4.7 μs with 15 kHz, and 4.7 / 16 = 0.29 μs for 240 kHz subcarrier spacing. Additionally, higher subcarrier spacings allow for reduced latency and increased support for high-frequency bands, essential for the ultra-reliable low-latency communications (URLLC) and enhanced mobile broadband (eMBB) applications in 5G.

== See also ==
- IMT-2020 – the International Telecommunication Union standards
- Network service
- Network virtualization
- Voice over NR
