= Common Public Radio Interface =

Communications standard

The Common Public Radio Interface (CPRI) standard defines an interface between Radio Equipment Control (REC) and Radio Equipment (RE). Oftentimes, CPRI links are used to carry data between cell sites/remote radio heads and base stations/baseband units.

The purpose of CPRI is to allow replacement of a copper or coax cable connection between a radio transceiver (used example for mobile-telephone communication and typically located in a tower) and a base station/baseband unit (typically located at the ground nearby), so the connection can be made to a remote and more convenient location. This connection (often referred to as the Fronthaul network) can be a fiber to an installation where multiple remote base stations may be served. This fiber supports both single and multi mode communication. The fiber end is connected with the Small Form-factor Pluggable (SFP) transceiver device.

The companies working to define the specification include Ericsson AB, Kontron Transportation, Huawei Technologies Co. Ltd, NEC Corporation and Nokia.

== See also ==
- Open Base Station Architecture Initiative (OBSAI)
- Remote radio head (RRH)
