= Radio access technology =

Physical connection method for a radio communication network

A radio access technology (RAT) is the underlying physical connection method for a radio communication network. Many modern mobile phones support several RATs in one device such as Bluetooth, Wi-Fi, and GSM, UMTS, LTE or 5G NR.

The term RAT was traditionally used in mobile communication network interoperability. More recently, the term RAT is used in discussions of heterogeneous wireless networks. The term is used when a user device selects between the type of RAT being used to connect to the Internet. This is often performed similar to access point selection in IEEE 802.11 (Wi-Fi) based networks.

== Inter-RAT (IRAT) handover ==
A mobile terminal, while connected using a RAT, performs neighbour cell measurements and sends measurement report to the network. Based on this measurement report provided by the mobile terminal, the network can initiate handover from one RAT to another, e.g. from WCDMA to GSM or vice versa. Once the handover with the new RAT is completed, the channels used by the previous RAT are released.

== See also ==
- Radio access network (RAN)
