= Y.1731 =

ITU-T Recommendation

G.8013/Y.1731
- Operations, administration and maintenance (OAM) functions and mechanisms for Ethernet-based networks
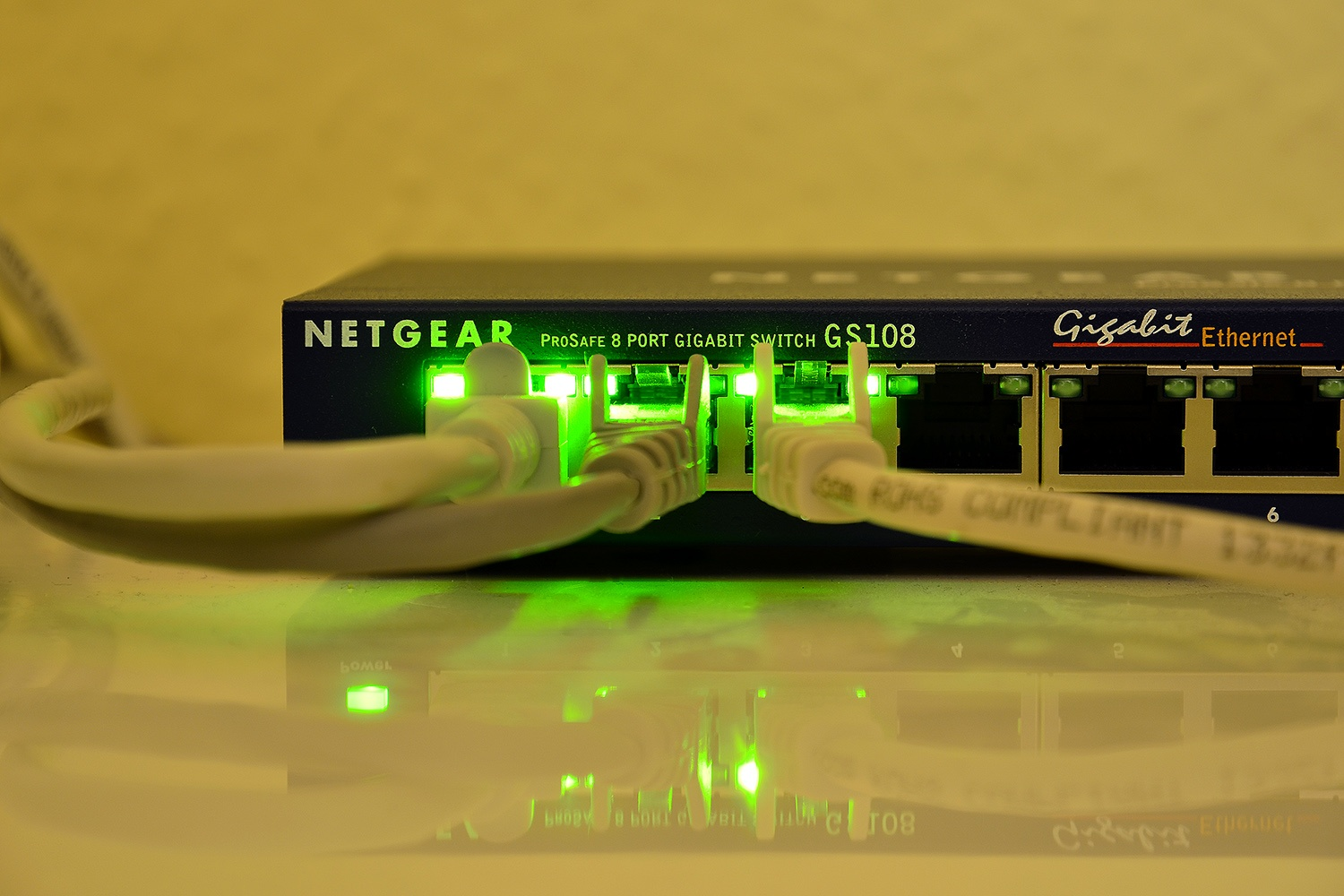
- Status: In force
- Year started: 2006
- Latest version: Corrigendum 2 (08/19); August 2019
- Organization: ITU-T
- Committee: ITU-T Study Group 13, ITU-T Study Group 15
- Website: www.itu.int/rec/T-REC-Y.1731

Y.1731 is an international standard that defines Operations, Administration and Maintenance (OAM) functions and mechanisms for Ethernet-based networks.

== History ==
The standard was first developed in 2006 by the Standardization Sector of the International Telecommunication Union (ITU-T) in ITU-T Study Group 13, publishing the original version, as well as a revised version in 2008. From 2010 revisions are done in Study Group 15, beginning with an amendment in 2010. Further major revisions followed in 2011, 2013, and most recently 2015 (as well as a number of amendments).

== Definitions ==
Y.1731 defines:

- Maintenance domains, their constituent maintenance points, and the managed objects required to create and administer them
- The relationship between maintenance domains and the services offered by VLAN-aware bridges and provider bridges
- The protocols and procedures used by maintenance points to maintain and diagnose connectivity faults within a maintenance domain
- Performance monitoring
