= Next Generation Mobile Networks =

Logo of the NGMN Alliance

The Next Generation Mobile Networks (NGMN) Alliance is a mobile telecommunications association of mobile operators, vendors, manufacturers and research institutes. It was founded by major mobile operators in 2006 as an open forum to evaluate candidate technologies to develop a common view of solutions for the next evolution of wireless networks. Its objective is to ensure the successful commercial launch of future mobile broadband networks through a roadmap for technology and friendly user trials. Its office is in Frankfurt, Germany.

The NGMN Alliance complements and supports standards organizations by providing a coherent view of what mobile operators require. The alliance's project results have been acknowledged by groups such as the 3rd Generation Partnership Project (3GPP), TeleManagement Forum (TM Forum) and the Institute of Electrical and Electronics Engineers (IEEE).

== Activities ==
The Initial phase of the NGMN Alliance involved working groups on technology, spectrum, intellectual property rights (IPR), ecosystem, and trials, to enable the launch of commercial next generation mobile services in 2010. In a white paper first released in March 2006, NGMN summarized a vision for mobile broadband communications and included recommendations as well as requirements. It provided operators´ relative priorities of key system characteristics, system recommendations and detailed requirements for the standards for the next generation of mobile broadband networks, devices and services.

From July 2007 to February 2008, standards and technologies were evaluated for next generation mobile networks. These were 3GPP Long Term Evolution (LTE) and its System Architecture Evolution (SAE), IEEE 802.16e (products known as WiMax), 802.20, and Ultra Mobile Broadband.

In June 2008, the NGMN Alliance announced that, “based on a thorough technology evaluation, the NGMN board concluded that LTE/SAE is the first technology which broadly meets its requirements as defined in the NGMN white paper. The NGMN Alliance therefore approves LTE/SAE as its first compliant technology”. Also in June 2008 the alliance announced it would work with the Femto Forum to ensure femtocells benefit from the technology.

The alliance worked on intellectual property rights "to adapt the existing IPR regime to provide a better predictability of the IPR licenses (...) to ensure Fair, Reasonable And Non-Discriminatory (FRAND) IPR costs". As part of this work, it issued a public request for information on LTE patent pool administration.

The alliance provided input to the International Telecommunication Union (ITU) World Radiocommunication Conference (WRC) on frequency allocation, since they considered a timely and globally aligned spectrum allocation policy a key to the development of a viable ecosystem on a national, regional and global scale. The ITU and regional bodies are developing channeling arrangements for the frequency bands identified at the ITU World Radio Conference in 2007. In October 2009, the NGMN spectrum working group released “Next Generation Mobile Networks Spectrum Requirements Update”, containing the status and NGMN views and requirements on frequency bands identified at the ITU WRC-07.

Since next generation devices, networks and services need to be synchronized for a successful launch, NGMN in February 2009 released a white paper which provided generic definitions for next generation (data only) devices to ensure that devices were available at the time when first networks were launched in 2010.

After the launch of the first LTE networks in 2010, the alliance then addressed challenges of network deployment, operations, and interworking, while focusing on LTE and its evolved packet core, as defined by the System Architecture Evolution.

In September 2010, NGMN published recommendations on operational aspects of next generation networks. Rising complexity and increasing cost of network operations due to heterogeneity of networks (supporting different technologies), number of network elements, the market need to gain flexibility in service management and to improve service quality drive the need to improve the overall network operations. The document outlines requirements for self-organizing network functionalities and operations and maintenance (O&M) to address these issues.

In 2014, the NGMN Board decided to focus future NGMN activities on defining the end-to-end requirements for 5G. A global team has developed the NGMN 5G White Paper (published March 2015) delivering consolidated operator requirements to support the standardisation and development of 5G. NGMN encouraged the industry to have 5G solutions available by 2020, which was exceeded by some operators that already launched 5G trials in 2019. The commercial introduction of 5G naturally varied from operator to operator.

In 2015, NGMN launched a 5G-focused work-programme that built on and further evolved the White Paper guidelines. The main 5G NGMN work-items for 2015 were: the development of technical 5G requirements and architectural design principles, the analysis of potential 5G solutions and the assessment of future use-cases and business models. Furthermore, the NGMN project teams addressed the areas IPR and Spectrum from a 5G perspective. In September 2015, the NGMN published a Q&A about 5G:

In 2020, NGMN published an updated White Paper on 5G, requesting a common platform architecture to allow edge computing to be used on a global scale. Furthermore the NGMN Alliance positioned itself to provide a fully integrated solution for Verticals that encompasses networks, clouds and platforms, with dynamic customisation, partnerships, end-to-end management, carrier-grade security and efficient spectrum use. At the same time the organisation highlighted that an increased focus needs to be given to further improving energy efficiency, sustainability, social wellbeing, trust, and digital inclusion.

In October 2020, the NGMN Alliance launched a project on 6G as well as a project on sustainability

A new strategy was announced by the NGMN Alliance in February 2021, focusing on disaggregation, sustainability and 6G while still supporting the implementation of 5G’s full potential. As a first outcome of that strategy, a project was launched to analyse the impact of disaggregation and cloudification on the operating model of mobile network operators and - in a pre-competitive environment - to develop operating model blueprints for enabling a successful E2E operation of disaggregated networks.5G Network

== Organization ==
The NGMN Alliance is organized as an association of more than 80 partners from the mobile telecommunications industry and research. About one third are mobile operators, representing well over one half of the total mobile subscriber base world-wide. The remainder comprises vendors and manufacturers accounting for more than 90% of the global footprint of mobile network development as well as universities or non-industrial research institutes.

== Cooperation ==
The NGMN Alliance co-operates with standards bodies and industry organisations like 3GPP, the European Telecommunications Standards Institute, the GSM Association, and the TM Forum. In July 2010, the alliance and the TM Forum agreed to work together on optimized management systems and operations of the next generation of mobile networks. In May 2011 the alliance became a market representation partner to 3GPP.

In December 2014 ETSI and NGMN signed a cooperation agreement to intensify the dialogue and exchange of information between the two organizations.

in June 2019, the EMEA Satellite Operators Associations (ESOA) and NGMN Alliance agreed to cooperate in the area of integration of satellite solutions in the 5G ecosystem.

In October 2020, the NGMN Alliance and the O-RAN Alliance signed a cooperation agreement, cooperating in the area of Radio Access Network decomposition of 4G and 5G networks.

In May 2021, the Linux Foundation and the NGMN Alliance signed a Memorandum of Understanding (MoU) for formal collaboration regarding end-to-end 5G and beyond.
