= IMT-2020 =

Official standards for 5G connectivity

International Mobile Telecommunications-2020 (IMT-2020 Standard) are the requirements issued by the ITU Radiocommunication Sector (ITU-R) of the International Telecommunication Union (ITU) in 2015 for 5G networks, devices and services.

On February 1, 2021, the standard was published as Recommendation ITU-R M.2150-0 titled Detailed specifications of the radio interfaces of IMT-2020, but most of it was finalized years earlier. For example the requirements for radio access technologies listed below were adopted in November 2017. Following the publication of the requirements the developers of radio access technologies such as 3GPP and ETSI are expected to develop 5G technologies meeting these requirements. 3GPP is developing radio access technologies 5G NR, LTE-M and NB-IoT that together are expected to meet all requirements, while ETSI is developing DECT-2020 NR and Nufront is developing EUHT (Enhanced Ultra High Throughput).

== Requirements ==
The following parameters are the requirements for IMT-2020 5G candidate radio access technologies. Note that these requirements are not intended to restrict the full range of capabilities or performance that candidate for IMT-2020 might achieve, nor are they intended to describe how the technologies might perform in actual deployments.

Capability	Description	5G requirement	Usage scenario
Downlink peak data rate	Minimum maximum data rate technology must support	20 Gbit/s	eMBB
Uplink peak data rate	Minimum maximum data rate technology must support	10 Gbit/s	eMBB
User experienced downlink data rate	Minimum data rate in dense urban test environment 95% of time (5th percentile)	100 Mbit/s	eMBB
User experienced uplink data rate	Minimum data rate in dense urban test environment 95% of time (5th percentile)	50 Mbit/s	eMBB
Latency	Radio network contribution to packet travel time	4 ms	eMBB
Latency	Radio network contribution to packet travel time	1 ms	URLLC
Mobility	Maximum speed for handoff and QoS requirements	500 km/h	eMBB/URLLC
Connection density	Total number of devices per unit area	10^{6}/km^{2}	mMTC
Energy efficiency	Data sent/received per unit energy consumption (by device or network)	Equal to 4G	eMBB
Area traffic capacity	Total traffic across coverage area	10 Mbps/m^{2}	eMBB
Peak downlink spectrum efficiency	Throughput per unit wireless bandwidth and per network cell	30 bit/s/Hz	eMBB
