= Open Base Station Architecture Initiative =

Trade association

- Abbreviation: OBSAI
- Formation: 2002
- Type: Trade group
- Purpose: Interface standards
- Website: www.obsai.com

The Open Base Station Architecture Initiative (OBSAI) was a trade association created by Hyundai, LG Electronics, Nokia, Samsung and ZTE in September 2002 with the aim of creating an open market for cellular network base stations. The hope was that an open market would reduce the development effort and costs traditionally associated with creating base station products.

== Goal ==
The OBSAI specifications provided the architecture, function descriptions and minimum requirements for integration of a set of common modules into a base transceiver station (BTS). It:

- defined an internal modular structure of wireless base stations.
- defined a set of standard BTS modules with specified form, fit and function such that BTS vendors can acquire and integrate modules from multiple vendors in an OEM fashion.
- defined internal digital interfaces between BTS modules to assure interoperability and compatibility.
- supported different access technologies such as GSM, Enhanced Data Rates for GSM Evolution (EDGE), CDMA2000, WCDMA or IEEE 802.16 marketed as WiMAX.

This was intended to provide the BTS integrator with flexibility. A version 2.0 system reference document was published in 2006.

== BTS structure ==
The OBSAI Reference Architecture defines four functional blocks, interfaces between them, and requirements for external interfaces.

=== Functional blocks ===
A base transceiver station (BTS) has four main blocks or logical entities: Radio Frequency (RF) block, Baseband block, Control and Clock block, and Transport block.

The Radio Frequency Block sends and receives signals to/from portable devices (via the air interface) and converts between digital data and antenna signal. Some of the main functions are D/A and A/D conversion, up/down conversion, carrier selection, linear power amplification, diversity transmit and receive, RF combining and RF filtering.

The Baseband Block processes the baseband signal. The functions include encoding/decoding, ciphering/deciphering, frequency hopping (GSM), spreading and Rake receiver (WCDMA), MAC (WiMAX), protocol frame processing, MIMO etc.

The Transport Block interfaces to external network, and provides functions such as QoS, security functions and synchronization.

Coordination between these three blocks is maintained by the Control and Clock Block.

=== Internal interfaces ===
Internal interfaces between the functional blocks are called reference points (RP).

RP1 is the interface that allows communication between the control block and the other three blocks. It includes control and clock signals. RP1 specification also specifies UDPCP - a UDP based reliable communication protocol. A version 2.1 of the reference point 1 interface was published in 2008.

RP2 provides a link between the transport and baseband blocks. Version 2.1 of the reference point 2 interface was published in 2008.

RP3 is the interface between baseband block and RF block. RP3-01 is an (alternate) interface between Local Converter and Remote RF block. Version 4.2 of the reference point 3 interface was published in 2010.

RP4 provides the DC power interface between the internal modules and DC power sources. Version 1.1 of the reference point 4 interface was published in 2010.

Most of the industry at the time revolved around achieving lower cost RF modules and power amplifiers (PA), as these two components usually account for nearly 50 percent of the BTS cost. Consequently, OBSAI works to define reference point 3 (RP3) prior to the other reference points to promote more competitive sources in the RF module and PA market.

=== External interfaces ===
Transport Block provides external network interface to operator network. Examples are: (lub) to the Radio Network Controller (RNC) for 3GPP systems, R6 to the Access Services Network Gateway (centralized Gateway) or R3 to Connectivity Services Network (CSN) for WiMAX systems.

RF Block provides external radio interface to subscriber devices. Examples are Uu or Um to the user equipment (UE) for 3GPP systems or R1 for WiMAX.

== See also ==
Common Public Radio Interface (CPRI), an alternative, competing, standard.
