= Remote radio head =

Type of radio used in wireless telecommunications networks

A remote radio head (RRH), also called a remote radio unit (RRU) in wireless networks, is a remote radio transceiver that connects to an operator radio control panel via electrical or wireless interface. When used to describe aircraft radio cockpit radio systems, the control panel is often called the radio head. It connects to an antenna via coaxial cable.

In wireless system technologies such as GSM, CDMA, UMTS, LTE, 5G NR this radio equipment is remote to baseband units such as BTS/NodeB/eNodeB/gNodeB or gNB. This equipment is used to extend the coverage of a baseband unit in challenging environments such as rural areas or tunnels. RRHs are generally connected to the baseband unit or base station which can be an x86 server on the ground near a cell tower, via a fiber optic cable using Common Public Radio Interface protocols. The RRH can also be a dedicated radio unit.

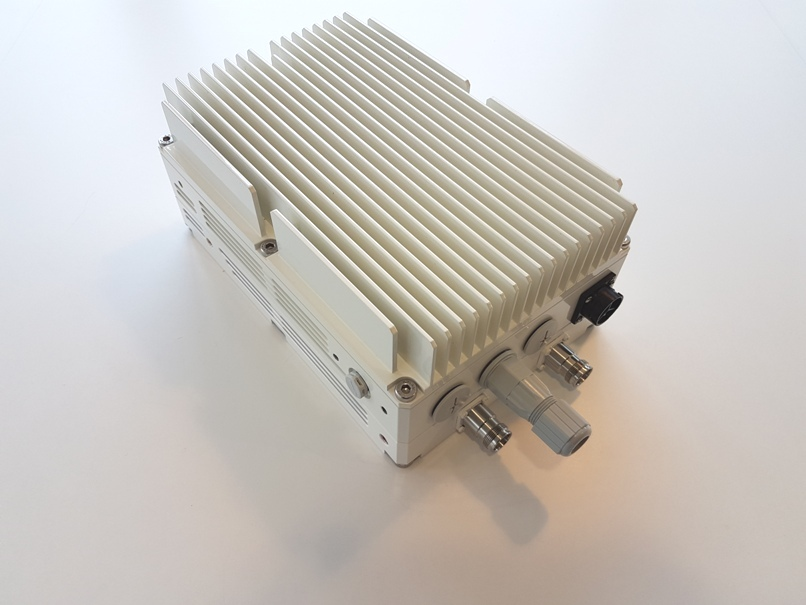
CableFree 4G/5G Remote Radio Head (RRH) with 2x2 MIMO, 2x20W RF power and CPRI fibre interface

RRHs have become one of the most important subsystems of today's new distributed base stations. The RRH contains RF circuitry plus analog-to-digital/digital-to-analog converters and up/down converters, and connects to, and thus drives the cell site's antenna. RRHs also have operation and management processing capabilities and a standardized optical interface to connect to the rest of the base station/baseband unit. This will be increasingly true as LTE and WiMAX are deployed. Remote radio heads make MIMO operation easier; they increase a base station's efficiency and facilitate easier physical location for gap coverage problems. RRHs will use the latest RF component technology including gallium nitride (GaN) RF power devices and envelope tracking technology within the RRH RF power amplifier (RFPA).

== RRH protection in fiber to the antenna systems ==
Fourth generation (4G) and beyond infrastructure deployments will include the implementation of Fiber to the Antenna (FTTA) architecture. FTTA architecture has enabled lower power requirements, distributed antenna sites, and a reduced base station footprint than conventional tower sites. The use of FTTA will promote the separation of power and signal components from the base station and their relocation to the top of the tower mast in a Remote Radio Head (RRH).

According to the Telcordia industry standard that establishes generic requirements for Fiber to the Antenna (FTTA) protection GR-3177, the RRH shifts the entire high-frequency and power electronic segments from the base station to a location adjacent to the antenna. The RRH will be served by optical fiber and DC power for the optical-to-electronic conversion at the RRH.

RRHs located on cell towers will require Surge Protective Devices (SPDs) to protect the system from lightning strikes and induced power surges. There is also a change in electrical overstress exposure due to the relocation of the equipment from the base station to the top of the mast.

=== Protection from lightning damage ===
RRHs can be installed in a low-profile arrangement along a rooftop, or can involve a much higher tower arrangement. When installed at the highest point on a structure (whether a building or a dedicated cell tower), they will be more vulnerable to receiving a direct lightning strike and higher induced lightning levels, compared with those installed in a lower profile manner below the upper edges of the building.

As noted in GR-3177, while surges can be induced into the RRH wiring for lightning striking the nearby rooftop or even the base station closure, the worst case will occur when a direct strike occurs to the antenna or its supporting structure. Designing the electrical protection to handle this situation will provide protection for less damaging scenarios... it can also be use in optical fiber communication but different type.

== See also ==
- Cell site
- Cellular network
- Telecom infrastructure sharing
- OpenBTS
- Wireless device radiation and health
- Radio
- Common Public Radio Interface
- Radio access network
