= Radio access network =

Wireless telecom organization feature

A radio access network (RAN) is part of a mobile telecommunication system implementing a radio access technology (RAT). Conceptually, it resides between a device such as a mobile phone, a computer, or any remotely controlled machine and provides connection with its core network (CN). Depending on the standard, mobile phones and other wireless connected devices are varyingly known as user equipment (UE), terminal equipment, mobile station (MS), etc. RAN functionality is typically provided by a silicon chip residing in both the core network as well as the user equipment. See the following diagram:

     CN
    /  ⧵
   /    ⧵
 RAN    RAN
 / ⧵    / ⧵
UE UE  UE UE

Examples of RAN types are:

- GRAN: GSM
- GERAN: essentially the same as GRAN but specifying the inclusion of EDGE packet radio services
- UTRAN: UMTS
- E-UTRAN: The Long Term Evolution (LTE) high speed and low latency
- 5G NR: The 5G RAN, a successor of LTE (see the above item)

It is also possible for a single handset/phone to be simultaneously connected to multiple RANs. Handsets capable of this are sometimes called dual-mode handsets. For instance, it is common for handsets to support both GSM and UMTS (a.k.a. "3G") RATs. Such devices seamlessly transfer an ongoing call between different radio access networks without the user noticing any disruption in service.

== RAN in the United States ==
According to research company New Street, mobile providers T-Mobile US and AT&T use Swedish communication company Ericsson as their primary RAN provider, while Verizon primarily uses South Korean provider Samsung. Nokia is the minority vendor for all major US wireless providers. According to EJL Wireless Research, Verizon is also using Ericsson.

== Architecture and Implementation ==
RANs connect communicating devices (user equipment like mobiles, terminal equipment, mobile station, etc), towers and core. So, a RAN has both hardware and software installations. Open RAN guides the open interfaces among RAN components.. Open RAN defines the standards around modularising RAN to decouple hard dependencies, scale infrastructure, secure communication and so on. Along with the growing demands of mobile connectivity, RANs continue to evolve catering to speeds, volume, agility and quality requirements.

== See also ==
- AirHop Communications
- IP connectivity access network
- C-RAN
- Open RAN
- Access network
- Base transceiver station
- Remote radio head
