= AppWare =

Rapid application development system

AppWare was a rapid application development system for Microsoft Windows and the classic Mac OS based on a simple graphical programming language. Applications were constructed by connecting together icons representing objects in the program and their commands. The resulting logic could be compiled on either platform and typically only required minor changes to the GUI layout to complete the port.

Originally introduced in 1989 as Serius89 by Serius Corporation, and eventually becoming Serius Developer, it is best known as AppWare when it was owned and marketed by Novell starting in 1993. Novell sold the product off in 1996, it was renamed MicroBrew, and development eventually ceased during 1997.

== History ==
=== Serius ===
Joe Firmage started development of what would become AppWare circa June 1987, originally in order to help develop an accounting system for his parents' greeting card company. In 1989, when he was 18 years old, he and his brother Ed formed Serius Corp. to market the product, now known as Serius89. The company was based in Salt Lake City, Utah.

The 1.0 version shipped for the Mac in August 1989, with two versions, Serius Programmer that allowed the creation of new applications using the existing object library, and Serius Developer that allowed new objects to be written in external computer languages. This release was followed by 1.1 in October, which added a new Database object, and the 1.2 update in December. Serius was one of several visual programming tools that were available on the Mac in the late 1980s, such as TGS Systems' Prograph. The Serius89 Programmer product sold for $295 and the Serius89 Developer for $495. A review of Serius89 1.2 by MacWEEK concluded that it was "a novel, fascinating approach to 'desktop programming' and, despite its shortcomings, we believe it's an investment that will pay dividends in the future."

A major update followed in April 1990, the 2.0 version. This included a greatly increased set of objects, including support for the Communications ToolBox and an associated Terminal object. This release also included a suite of multimedia objects that allowed for the creation of interactive kiosk apps and similar. A 2.1 release followed in October, and an enormous performance upgrade in 2.2 in October 1991. By the end of 1991, Serius Corp. had attracted several outside investors and had 21 employees.

In January 1992 3.0 was release, including significant changes. The largest change followed in November 1992, however, with the introduction of Windows support and a renaming to Serius Workshop and Serius Developer Pro (mapping to Programmer and Developer from previous versions).

=== AppWare ===
Novell had invested in Serius on a number of occasions. In June 1993, during Ray Noorda's period of intense empire building, Novell purchased Serius outright. The company also purchased Software Transformations Inc., who made a cross-platform object code library that could be used to port conventional programs to a number of platforms, including the Mac, Windows, SunOS, UnixWare, HP-UX, with plans to add many more.

Together, Serius and Software Transformations were bundled under the new name AppWare, although they were unrelated products. Immediately after the acquisitions, AppWare was positioned as one of the "three pillars" of Novell's long-term strategy, the others being NetWare and UnixWare. The plan, according to statements from Novell, was to make it easier for 3rd party developers to write network-aware programs.

Under the new AppWare branding, Serius became the AppWare Visual AppBuilder, or VAB for short. The name of the internal Objects also changed, becoming "AppWare Loadable Modules" (ALMs), in keeping with the naming for their NetWare Loadable Modules (NLMs) under their core Novell NetWare product. The newly renamed version was released as a 1.0 version in October 1993. Software Transformations' code base became the AppWare Foundation.

It was not long before the AppWare plans started to fall apart. By early 1994, Novell's support for AppWare Foundation was waning, and in September 1994 they announced they would be selling the product to a third party. They did state that development of Visual AppBuilder would continue, and a Unix port would be following. They also continued to release a number of new ALMs. The Unix versions never appeared, instead, the Mac and Windows versions were renamed AppWare, and updated in a 1.1 release in 1994.

=== MicroBrew ===
Noorda was forced from Novell in April 1994, and many of the companies and products he had purchased were subsequently sold off. Joe Firmage became disillusioned with Novell in mid-1995, following its decision to sell UnixWare and abandon the "SuperNOS" project that would have combined UnixWare and Netware, and left Novell later that year. Novell then publicly stated in November 1995 that it was looking for a buyer for AppWare.

In March 1996, it was announced (based on an agreement that had been signed the month before) that Novell had sold all rights to the AppWare technology to a new company called Network Multimedia Inc. (NMI), which was headed by Ed Firmage, who had been director of AppWare marketing at Novell. Ed Firmage said that the new firm had plans to enhance and expand the capabilities of AppWare on several different platforms and in combination with several object and document technologies. (Joe Firmage did not move to Network Multimedia, instead co-founding USWeb after leaving Novell.)

Then in July 1996, Network Multimedia renamed AppWare as MicroBrew and relaunched it as a visual development tool for Internet applications. Network Multimedia was still making announcements regarding MicroBrew in February 1997.

The company continued development for a time, but folded in 1997.

Users of the system attempted to negotiate a release of the source code into some sort of open source license in early 2000, and started The Serious Project on SourceForge to coordinate development. However this release does not appear to have taken place, the page has no code.

== Description ==
Applications in AppWare were constructed by dropping icons representing pre-rolled objects onto a worksheet, and then connecting them together to represent message flows between them. Communications was mediated by a protocol known as the Object Interaction Protocol. Some of the "objects" represented basic logic statements, while others represented GUI widgets such as text editors. The overall logic for any particular object, say a text editor in a window, was constructed as a series of chains of these object connections, fired up in response to an event. At a high level the system is similar in concept to HyperCard or Visual Basic, in that the program's logic is strongly associated with the object that sends some initial event.

AppWare built true "double clickable" applications that ran natively on either Windows or the Mac. Unlike most systems of the sort, like HyperCard, the applications did not end up looking generic, and generally behaved as first-class citizens of the host system. However the applications were also similar to HyperCard in that they generally did not support multi-window operation or the creation of new documents. AppWare applications consisted of a fixed number of forms and windows, a side effect of its lack of a NEW-type operator for creating new objects at runtime.
