= Global Finance (magazine) =

Trade publication

- Cover of the April 2010 issue
- Type: Monthly
- Format: Magazine
- Owner(s): Global Finance Media, Inc.
- Editor: Andrea Fiano
- Founded: 1987
- Language: English
- Headquarters: Manhattan, New York City, United States
- Circulation: 50,050 worldwide
- Website: https://www.gfmag.com

Global Finance is an English-language monthly financial magazine. The magazine was founded in 1987 by a team consisting of Joseph D. Giarraputo, the founder and former publisher of Venture, Carl G. Burgen, Stephan Spahn, H. Allen Fernald, and Paolo Panerai. The magazine covers the topic of financial globalization and targets Chairmen, CEOs, Presidents, CFOs, Treasurers, and other financial officers. The magazine is circulated in 158 countries and has 50,050 subscribers and recipients worldwide, BPA Worldwide certified.

Global Finance Media, Inc.'s majority shareholder is Class Editori Group SpA, an Italian publishing company that produces two financial newspapers, lifestyle magazines, news agencies, digital televisions, etc. Joseph D. Giarraputo is the second-largest shareholder.

Global Finance has offices in New York, London, Milan, and Rio de Janeiro.

== Features ==
Global Finance covers topics related to the international finance industry, including corporate finance, joint ventures, M&A, country profiles, capital markets, investor relations, currencies, banking, risk management, custody, direct investment, and money management.

The magazine also holds several awards ceremonies throughout the year to recognize the winning financial institutions and companies. The largest of these ceremonies coincides with the IMF and World Bank's yearly meetings.

== World's Best Banks ==
Each year, the magazine releases a list of the "best banks in the world". Global Finance defines the rankings as, "The winners do not necessarily have to be the largest banks, but rather the best, being those with the attributes that companies seek when selecting a bank. These include effective risk management systems, quality service, and optimal practices in corporate governance."

== See also ==
- The Banker
- CFO
- Chief Executive Magazine
- The Economist
