= Kanwal Rekhi =

Indian-American businessman (born 1945)

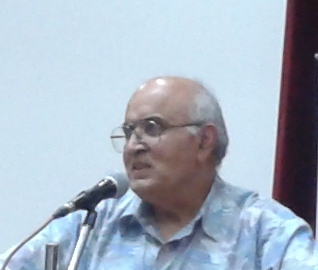
- Rekhi in Bangalore on 23 September 2013
- Born: 1945 (age 80–81); Rawalpindi, Punjab, British India (now in Punjab, Pakistan, Pakistan)
- Occupation: Managing director at Inventus Capital Partners
- Years active: 1982–present
- Known for: Co-Founder of Excelan, Co-Founder of TiE, Venture capitalist, EVP of Novell
- Awards: Arthur-Young/Venture Magazine Entrepreneur of the Year, 1987; Bina Chaudhuri Award for Distinguished Service by California Institute of Integral Studies
- Website: inventuscap.com/team/kanwal-rekhi/

Kanwal Rekhi (born August 29, 1945) (Punjabi : ਕੰਵਲ ਰੇਖੀ) is an Indian-American businessman. He was the first Indian-American founder and CEO to take a venture-backed company public on the Nasdaq stock exchange.

== Career ==
Rekhi had worked as an engineer, systems analyst, and manager before venturing into entrepreneurship. At the age of 36, he moved to San Jose, California and co-founded Excelan in 1982, a manufacturer of smart Ethernet components, and was named president and CEO in 1985. The company went public on the Nasdaq in 1987, and merged with Novell in 1989. He remained at Novell as an executive vice-president and the -chief technology officer of the company, later joining the board of directors. Rekhi retired from Novell in 1995. After leaving Novell, he was the CEO at CyberMedia from January 1998 until its merger with Network Associates (now McAfee) in September 1998.

In 1994, Rekhi became a full-time angel investor, investing in more than 50 startups, of which he led the initial financing and was a member of the board of directors for 23 companies. His venture financings have resulted in 21 exits including six IPOs to date. Also active in Indian public policy related to venture, Rekhi advised India government policy makers in reforming venture regulations. This encouraged fund formation in India, and Rekhi was the founding limited partner behind Infinity Capital-India a successful early-stage India venture fund.

In 2007, Rekhi co-founded Inventus Capital Partners, and currently serves as managing director. During his time at Inventus, he has invested in companies including GENWI, Salorix, Poshmark, and Sierra Atlantic (acquired by Hitachi Consulting).

In 1995, he co-founded TiE, The Indus Entrepreneurs, a nonprofit support network to provide advice, contacts, and funding to Indian Americans hoping to start businesses. He also acted as an expert in advising the Prime Minister of India and his government for laying the foundation for the country's Information technology expansion. Rekhi has served as a trustee on the global board of TiE. He is also a former chairman of the Centre for Civil Society.

== Philanthropy ==
Rekhi contributed $5 million to Michigan Tech in 2000. To help set up a new school of Information Technology, he donated $3 million to IIT Bombay which named one of its schools after him as the "Kanwal Rekhi School of Information Technology (KReSIT)"(which was merged in 2006 with the department of computer science and engineering).

== Awards and recognition ==
In 2003 Rekhi was awarded the Bina Chaudhuri Award for Distinguished Service from the California Institute of Integral Studies. He was also awarded "Entrepreneur of the Year" in 1987 by Arthur Young and Venture magazine.
