= Novell File Reporter =

Data management software

- Developer: Novell
- Initial release: January 2010
- Stable release: 2.6.1 / October 2, 2015
- Type: System Software
- Website: Novell File Reporter

Novell File Reporter (NFR) is software that allows network administrators to identify files stored on the network and generates reports regarding the size of individual files, file type, when files were last accessed, and where duplicates exist. Additionally, the File Reporter tracks storage volume capacity and usage. It is a component of the Novell File Management Suite.

== How it works ==
Novell File Reporter examines and reports on terabytes of data via a central reporting engine (NFR Engine) and distributed agents (NFR Agents). The NFR Engine schedules the scans of file instances conducted by NFR Agents, processes and compiles the scans for reporting purposes, and provides report information to the user interface.

In addition to the standard reports it can generate, the NFR Engine can also produce "trigger reports" in response to specific events (a server volume crossing a capacity threshold, for example). Accordingly, the NFR Engine monitors the data gathered by the NFR Agents in order to identify these "triggers."

The NFR Engine when working in either eDirectory or Active Directory connects to the directory via a Directory Services Interface (DSI) and thus can monitor and check file permissions.
