= Novell File Management Suite =

- Developer(s): Novell
- Initial release: January 2010
- Type: Software suite
- Website: Novell File Management Suite

Novell File Management Suite is a suite of applications designed for the identity -based indexing and management of user files on enterprise networks. The three components of the File Management Suite are Novell Storage Manager, Novell File Reporter, and Novell Dynamic File Services. The Suite was introduced in January 2010.
