= CPTN Holdings =

Microsoft-led technology consortium

CPTN Holdings LLC is a consortium of technology companies led by Microsoft that acquired a portfolio of 882 patents as part of the sale of Novell to Attachmate.

As of December 2010, CPTN's members are believed to be Microsoft, Apple Inc., Oracle and EMC Corporation.

It was later reported that the Rücknahme, the filing with the German Federal Cartel Office by the principals of CPTN Holdings was withdrawn on December 30, 2010, after letters of protest were filed by Open Source advocates. However, other sources indicate that the filing was only delayed to raise more funds.

The U.S. Department of Justice announced that in order to proceed with the first phase of their acquisition of certain patents and patent applications from Novell Inc., CPTN Holdings LLC and its owners altered their original agreements to address the department's antitrust concerns. The department said that, as originally proposed, the deal would jeopardize the ability of open source software, such as Linux, to continue to innovate and compete in the development and distribution of server, desktop, and mobile operating systems, middleware, and virtualization products.

With regard to licensing the patents:

- All the Novell patents will be acquired subject to the GNU General Public License, Version 2, a widely adopted open-source license, and the Open Invention Network (OIN) License, a significant license for the Linux System;
- CPTN does not have the right to limit which of the patents, if any, are available under the OIN license; and
- Neither CPTN nor its owners will make any statement or take any action with the purpose of influencing or encouraging either Novell or Attachmate to modify which of the patents are available under the OIN license.
