= Robert Frankenberg =

American computer engineer and business executive

Robert J. Frankenberg (born 1947) is an American computer engineer and business executive who served as chairman, president and chief executive officer of Novell, Inc. from 1994 to 1996.

== Life and career ==
Frankenberg spent much of his career at Hewlett-Packard (HP), starting there in 1969. While at HP, he earned a degree in computer engineering from San Jose State University in 1974 and completed the Stanford Executive Program at Stanford Graduate School of Business. In 1985 he was promoted to general manager of the Information Systems Group and made vice president in 1989. He led the revival of HP's personal computer unit, and in 1991, he was promoted to group vice president of personal information products.

He then moved to Novell in 1994, succeeding Raymond Noorda. He spent much of his tenure divesting properties acquired by Noorda in a bid to compete with Microsoft. He sold Wordperfect and Quattropro to Corel and Unix Systems Laboratories to Santa Cruz Operation, taking huge losses. Analysts stated that Novell missed opportunities to capitalize on client–server computing and emerging Internet-based technologies.

In 1997 he became president and CEO of Encanto Networks, Inc. He has been a management consultant with NetVentures since 1996. Frankenberg has served on several corporate boards, including Nuance Communications, Inc., Daw Technologies, Inc., and Scansoft, Inc. He has been on the boards of Electroglas, Inc. since 1993, Caere Corporation since 1996, Secure Computing Corporation since 1996, National Semiconductor since 1999, and Sqlstream since 2011. He served as board chair and acting CEO of Kinzan, Inc. from 1999 to 2006. In 2013, he was appointed as a board member to Polycom, a broadband service company, along with Martha Helena Bejar.

He has served as a trustee of Westminster College, Salt Lake City, since 1997.
