= Novell Storage Manager =

System software package

- Developer(s): Novell
- Initial release: 2004
- Stable release: 4.1 / October 7, 2014
- Type: System Software
- Website: Novell Storage Manager

Novell Storage Manager is a system software package released by Novell in 2004 that uses identity, policy and directory events to automate full lifecycle management of file storage for individual users and organizational groups. By tying storage management to an organization's existing identity infrastructure, it has been pointed out, Novell Storage Manager enables the administration of users across all file servers "as a single pool rather than [in] separate independently managed domains." Novell Storage Manager is a component of the Novell File Management Suite.

== How It Works ==
Novell Storage Manager dynamically manages and provisions storage based on user and group events that occur in the directory, including user creations, group assignments, moves, renames, and deletions. When a change happens in the directory that affects a user’s file storage needs or user storage policy, Storage Manager applies the appropriate policy and makes the necessary changes at the file system level to address those storage needs.

The following key components comprise Novell Storage Manager's identity and policy-driven state machine architecture: Directory services; Storage policies; Novell Storage Manager event monitors; Novell Storage Manager policy engine; Novell Storage Manager agents; and Action objects. This state machine architecture enables the engine to properly deal with transient waits with directory synchronization issues. It also allows recovery from failures involving network communications, a target server or a server running a component of Storage Manager—including the policy engine itself. If a failure or interruption occurs at any point during operation, Storage Manager will be able to successfully continue the operation from where it was when the interruption occurred.

== Reviews ==
Jon Toigo called Novell Storage Manager "a robust and smart approach to corralling user files... into an organized and efficient management scheme". He also said it was "best in class" of the products he'd reviewed.
