= Novell exteNd =

- Developer(s): Novell
- Type: Web development

Novell exteNd, formerly known as SilverStream, was a web application development suite from Novell that was discontinued in 2005.

== History ==
Novell had purchased SilverStream in the summer of 2002.

As of November 2003, exteNd was still a "work in progress" according to InfoWorld.

== Overview ==
The latest version was 5.2. With the release of Novell Identity Manager 3, the components of the portal services in exteNd were rebranded into the IDM User Application, a component of NetIQ Identity Manager.

The ExteNd platform provides a visual environment that simplifies the development and deployment of business solutions that exploit existing systems. Based on Java technology, it contains tools for integration of legacy systems to Web Services with XML and Java EE. Web Portal contains standard-based portlets.

=== Components ===
Novell exteNd has four components:

- The exteNd Application Server, which extends the SilverStream application server
- The exteNd Composer, a run-time engine and development suite
- The exteNd Director, which constructs and executes portals and web applications
- The exteNd Workbench, an IDE which Novell was in the process of merging with the exteNd Director. The tool provides an intuitive GUI for deploying on J2EE.

== Integration structure ==
Integration connectors includes:

- IBM 3270
- IBM 5250
- EDI
- HTML
- SAP
- CICS
- JMS
- HP 3000
- JDBC
- LDAP
- Telnet
- Tandem
- T27

== Uses and recognition ==
Users of Novell exteNd included Hartford Hospital and Imperial Sugar Company.
