= Novell =

1980–2014 American multinational software and services company

Novell, Inc.

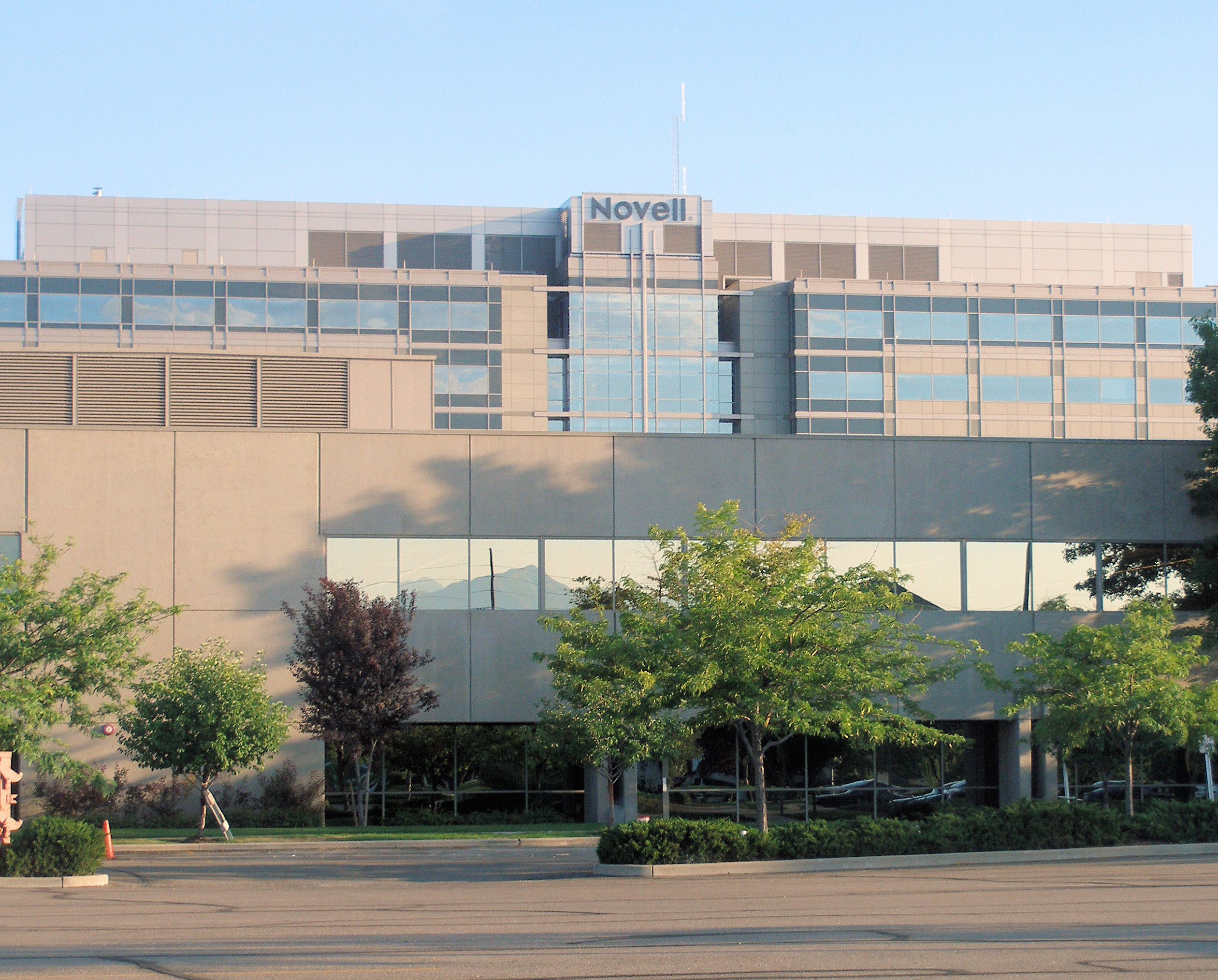
- Headquarters tower (Building H) in Provo, Utah in 2008
- Type: Public
- Traded as: Nasdaq: NOVL
- Industry: Computer software
- Founded: August 1980; 46 years ago Orem, Utah, United States
- Founder: George Canova; Jack Davis
- Defunct: November 2014; 12 years ago
- Fate: Acquired by The Attachmate Group, then by Micro Focus International and OpenText
- Headquarters: Provo, Utah; Waltham, Massachusetts
- Key people: Drew Major; Ray Noorda; Craig Burton; Judith Clarke; Kanwal Rekhi; Robert Frankenberg; Eric Schmidt; Jack Messman; Ronald Hovsepian
- Products: Novell NetWare; Novell GroupWise; Novell Open Enterprise Server; Novell Vibe; Novell ZENworks
- Revenue: $2.0 billion (peak, 1994 and 1995)
- Number of employees: 10,150 (peak, 1994)
- Website: www.novell.com

Novell, Inc. (/noʊˈvɛl/) was an American software and services company headquartered in Provo, Utah, that existed from 1980 until 2014. Its most significant product was the multi-platform network operating system known as NetWare. Novell technology contributed to the emergence of local area networks, which displaced the dominant mainframe computing model and changed computing worldwide.

Under the leadership of chief executive Ray Noorda, NetWare became the dominant form of personal computer networking during the second half of the 1980s and first half of the 1990s. At its high point, NetWare had a 63 percent share of the market for network operating systems and by the early 1990s there were over half a million NetWare-based networks installed worldwide encompassing more than 50 million users. Novell was the second-largest maker of software for personal computers, trailing only Microsoft Corporation, and became instrumental in making Utah Valley a focus for technology and software development.

During the early to mid-1990s, Noorda attempted to compete directly with Microsoft by acquiring Digital Research, Unix System Laboratories, WordPerfect, and the Quattro Pro division of Borland. These moves did not work out, due to new technologies not fitting well with Novell's existing user base or being too late to compete with equivalent Microsoft products. NetWare began losing market share once Microsoft bundled network services with the Windows NT operating system and its successors. Despite new products such as Novell Directory Services and GroupWise, Novell entered a long period of decline. Eventually Novell acquired SUSE Linux and attempted to refocus its technology base. Jeffrey M Jaffe, who was Executive Vice President and CTO from 2005 until 2010, led negotiations that resulted in a Novell partnership with Microsoft, a portion of which included Microsoft agreeing to be a re-distributor of Suse Linux. Despite building or acquiring several new kinds of products, Novell failed to find consistent success and never regained its past dominance.

The company was an independent corporate entity until it was acquired as a wholly owned subsidiary by The Attachmate Group in 2011. Attachmate was subsequently acquired in 2014 by Micro Focus International which was acquired in turn by OpenText in 2023. Novell products and technologies are now integrated within various OpenText divisions.

== History ==
=== Origins as a hardware company ===
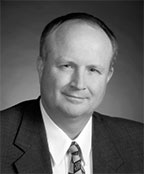
Novell's chief scientist was Drew Major, here seen later in his career.

The company began as Novell Data Systems Inc. (NDSI), a computer systems company located in Orem, Utah that intended to manufacture and market small business computers, computer terminals, and other peripherals. It was co-founded by George Canova and Jack Davis, two experienced computer industry executives. While some later sources place the creation of Novell Data Systems in 1979, more contemporaneous sources indicate August 1980. Canova became president of the new company and Davis was in charge of sales and marketing. The suggestion for the company's name came from Canova's wife, who thought it meant "new" in French (in fact the French word is either the masculine nouveau or the feminine nouvelle). Dennis Fairclough was not a founder of Novell Data Systems, but he did work with the company from its early days and later worked for Novell

A funding proposal was brought to Pete Musser, chairman of the board of Safeguard Scientifics, Inc., a Pennsylvania-based, technology-focused venture capital firm that was an offshoot of the older Safeguard Business Systems. Safeguard Scientifics believed a new computer systems company could help the Business Systems company automate their accounting systems. Accordingly, Safeguard Scientifics provided over $2 million in seed funding, and they became the majority owner of Novell Data Systems. Canova also owned a significant portion of the new company.

Novell Data Systems set up offices in a former carpet warehouse located in an industrial park near Geneva Steel. By November 1980, they advertising to hire staff.

At first the company began to grow rapidly. By mid-1981 the company was selling two products, the Nexus Series microcomputer and the Image 800 dot matrix printer. Orders began shipping during the second half of 1981. The computer product was based on the Zilog Z80 microprocessor and the CP/M operating system.

The company subsequently did not do well. The microcomputer produced by the company was late to an increasingly crowded market, and had limited popularity relative to competitors. According to one paraphrase of a Value Line report on Novell Data Systems as a whole during this period, their "revenue was minimal, but expenses were tremendous." Davis was fired from Novell Data Systems in November 1981.

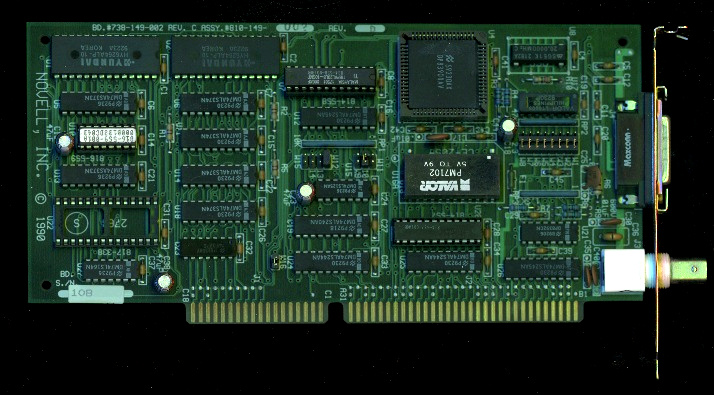
Novell made some networking hardware products even after NetWare became a success; here, a Novell NE2000 16-bit ISA 10BASE-2 Ethernet card from 1990.

In order to compete on systems sales, Novell Data Systems planned a program to link more than one microcomputer to operate together. A group of BYU students known as the SuperSet Software team began consulting for Novell in 1981: Drew Major, Dale Neibaur, and Kyle Powell. They developed a multiplayer video game, Snipes.

During the first calendar quarter of 1982, heavy costs continued to be incurred at Novell Data Systems, which resulted in management shuffles, organizational consolidations, and a significant layoff. Canova was fired and Jack Messman, representing Safeguard Scientifics, was named president. Seeing Snipes being played on three different types of personal computers persuaded Messman that SuperSet's networking technology was valuable. The poor performance of Novell Data Systems resulted in losses being announced in April 1982 for the publicly-held Safeguard Scientifics and put pressure on that company's stock price. However, by this point the computer-linking work that the SuperSet group had produced was drawing considerable interest and Novell Data Systems was describing themselves as a company that made not just stand-alone microcomputers but also products for local area networking (LAN). The dual emphasis on hardware and software products continued for several months. but continued to have troubled results, and in July 1982 another round of layoffs took place which resulted in the employee count being reduced from 50 people to 30.

At that time Safeguard reported that it would be writing down $3.4 million in losses due to Novell Data Systems' switch from being a hardware company to a software company. Throughout 1982 there were further management shuffles with other people being named president of the company. Major, Neibaur, and Powell continued to support Novell through their SuperSet Software group. As Major later said, "It was great that our hardware was so lousy because that gave us the idea that hardware wasn't really where the value was."

Two other important NDSI employees were strategist Craig Burton and communications specialist Judith Clarke. Despite its struggles, Novell Data Systems had a presence at the COMDEX show in Las Vegas in November 1982. Engineer Ray Noorda saw the presentation and become interested in the company's potential.

=== Rise to networking dominance ===
==== A new company ====
Novell's so-called "shark's teeth" logo, used from the late 1980s to 1996

On January 25, 1983, the company was incorporated under the shortened name of Novell, Inc. In April 1983, the appointment of Noorda as president and CEO of Novell, Inc. was publicly announced. Noorda was a veteran executive of General Electric and the past CEO of several other companies and had garnered a reputation as a turn-around expert. Messman was chairman of the board and continued to represent the interests of Safeguard Scientifics, which was still majority owner in the new Novell.

The new Novell started with around 15 employees. Noorda emphasized that the file server product acquired from Novell Data Systems would be the heart of what the new Novell would be doing. Later that same year, the company introduced its most significant product, the multi-platform network operating system (NOS), Novell NetWare.

Funding for the new company was still an issue, and Musser contacted two Safeguard investors and brokers, Barry Rubenstein and Fred Dolan, who were with the Cleveland brokerage house Prescott, Ball and Turben, in these efforts. Rubenstein and Dolan eventually came up with the idea of a rights offering to Safeguard shareholders. Accordingly, in January 1985, Safeguard Scientifics made an initial offering of shares in Novell, Inc. to its own shareholders, at $2.50 a share. The sale brought Safeguard more than $5 million in cash, and Safeguard's ownership in Novell went from 51 percent down to 24 percent. Novell, Inc. began trading as an over-the-counter stock.

==== NetWare ====
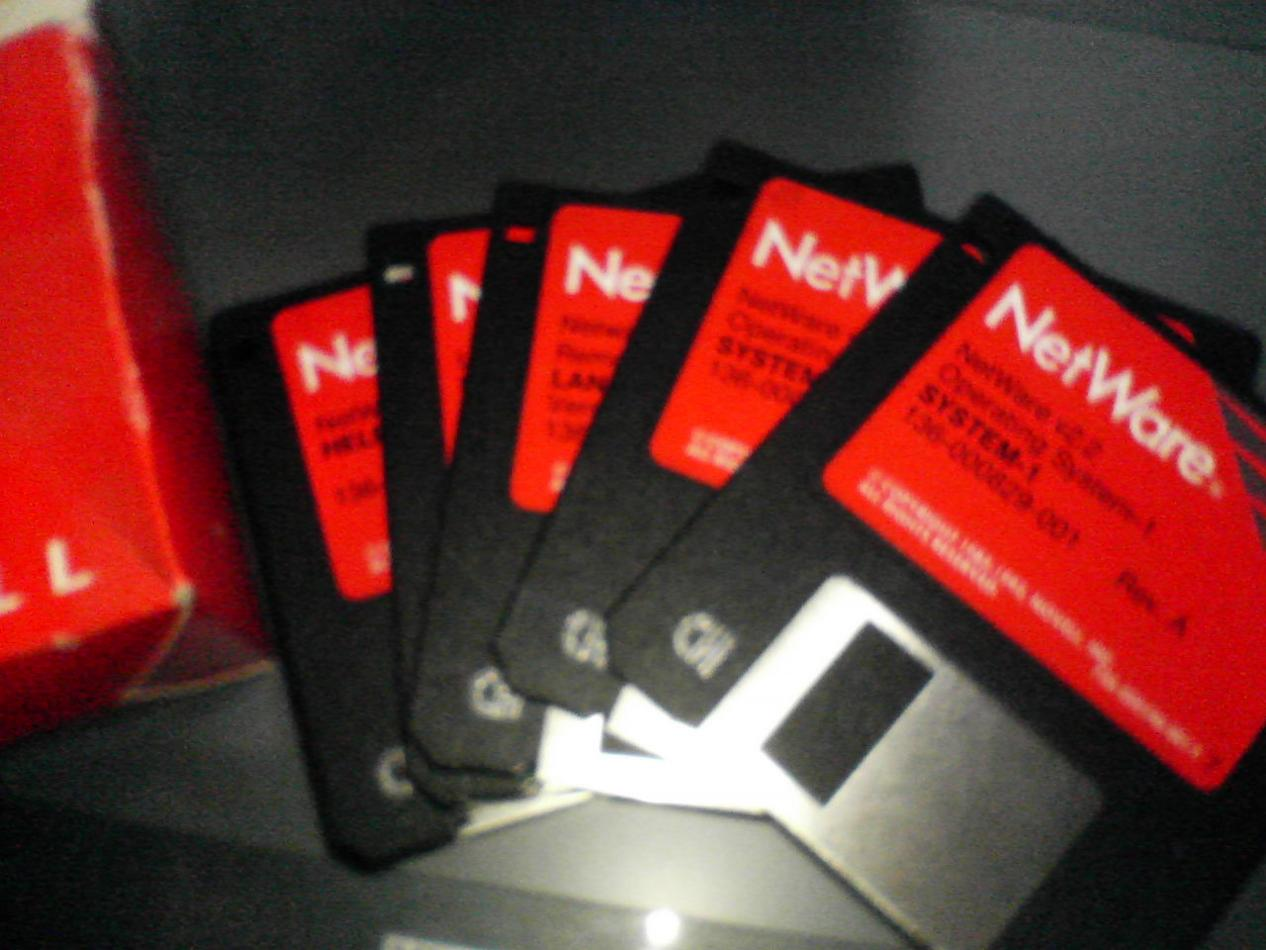
Floppy disks for NetWare 2.2

The first Novell product was a proprietary hardware server based on the Motorola 68000 processor and using a star topology. This, with the network operating system (NOS) on it, was known as Novell S-Net, or ShareNet, and it achieved some visibility; by April 1983, advertisements were seen in trade publications for third-party software products which stated they were compatible with Novell ShareNet.

The company realized that making a proprietary solution in this sense was disadvantageous and looked instead to the IBM PC as an alternative platform. Now called NetWare, the network operating system was ported to run on an IBM PC XT with an Intel 8086 processor and supported centralized, multitasking file and print services. By March 1984, Novell was putting out announcements about third-party products that worked with Novell NetWare.

NetWare came on the computing scene just as the IBM PC was emerging as a market force and applications such as the VisiCalc spreadsheet for the Apple II were showing what microcomputers could do for businesses. There was an immediate demand for local area networking that could make files and printers available across many PCs. In addition, the advent of the PC caused organizational changes within companies and enterprises and allowed Novell to find entryways into individual departments or regional facilities rather than having to convince upper management of the value of networking. Thus, Novell's timing was spot on. As the New York Times subsequently wrote, "Novell, in one of those instances of serendipity and visionary thinking that are the stuff of personal computer legend, found itself in the right place at the right time."

Partly in consequence of its design of running at kernel level ring 0 without regard for separate or protected address spaces, and thus not having the properties of a general-purpose operating system, NetWare was known for being very fast in operation. This trend continued into 1987 with the Advanced NetWare/286 release, which was well received within the industry. NetWare also excelled with respect to computer security considerations, supporting user- and group-based roles and volume- and file-level access restrictions, thus making it attractive to systems administrators.

Novell based its network protocol on Xerox Network Systems (XNS), and created its own standards which it named Internetwork Packet Exchange (IPX) and Sequenced Packet Exchange (SPX). These protocols were based on a client–server model. File and print services ran on the NetWare Core Protocol (NCP) over IPX, as did Routing Information Protocol (RIP) and Service Advertising Protocol (SAP).

Starting in 1987, Novell began selling its own Ethernet-based network adapter cards. These included the 8-bit NE1000, and then in 1988, the 16-bit NE2000. They priced them lower than cards from competitors such as 3Com, whose card Novell had previously been distributing. By 1989, Novell's cards were being sold at a rate of 20,000 per month, aggressively expanding Novell's market presence. At that point, Novell transferred the NE1000/NE2000 business to Anthem Electronics, the firm that had actually been making them, but the cards remained branded as Novell products.

As author James Causey would later write, "NetWare deserves the lion's share of the credit for elevating PC-based local area networks from being cute toys to providing powerful, reliable, and serious network services. NetWare was the first Intel-based network operating system to provide a serious alternative to mainframe-based server networks, providing critical reliability and security features needed in the modern enterprise."

Novell acquired Kanwal Rekhi's company Excelan in 1989; Excelan manufactured smart Ethernet cards and commercialized the Internet protocol TCP/IP, solidifying Novell's presence in these areas. The acquisition combined Novell's $281 million in annual revenue with Excelan's $66 million. Rekhi became a high-ranking Novell executive, and played an influential strategic and managerial role with the company over the next several years. Excelan was based in San Jose, California, and they, along with a couple of prior Novell acquisitions, formed the basis for Novell's presence in Silicon Valley going forward.

==== NetWare 386 ====
By 1989 NetWare had an estimated 40-60% of the NOS market. That year Novell released NetWare 386, also known as NetWare 3.0, which gave NetWare more modern architectural qualities, in conjunction with new capabilities in the Intel 386 processor. NetWare maintained its character as a dedicated network operating system rather than containing network capabilities as part of a general-purpose operating system. The NetWare kernel's ability to dynamically load and unload drivers was greatly appreciated by users and the ability to write NetWare Loadable Modules (NLMs) in the C programming language was also a significant benefit. NetWare 3 supported interactions with Apple's Macintosh computers as well as with Unix-based workstations, thus enabling NetWare to expand upon file and print sharing towards accessing business-critical data within companies. This allowed NetWare to work with database products from companies such as Oracle Corporation and Sybase.

An analyst for Dataquest said that NetWare 386 "is truly a blow-away-the-competition type product". Overall, NetWare 3 was the most significant rewrite that the product would ever get, and proved very successful. By 1990, Novell had an almost monopolistic position in NOS for any business requiring a network.

There were competitor companies in the same space, such as Corvus Systems, Banyan Systems, and LANtastic, but none of them made much of a dent in Novell's business. Microsoft tried on two early occasions to take on Novell in networking, first with the MS-NET product and then with LAN Manager, but both failed badly. IBM similarly had limited success in this area. From 1988 to 1992, Novell's revenues rose almost three-fold, to $933 million a year, with about half of Novell's sales coming from North America and half from overseas. Earnings also rose to $249 million a year. From 1986 to 1991, Novell's stock price climbed twelve-fold.

With this market leadership, Novell began to acquire and build services on top of its NetWare operating platform. These services extended NetWare's capabilities with such products as NetWare for SAA and Novell multi-protocol router.

However, Novell was also diversifying, moving away from its smaller users to target large corporations and wide area networks. A marketing and development alliance with IBM announced in 1991 was part of this initiative. The company did later attempt to refocus with NetWare for Small Business. It reduced investment in research and was slow to improve the product administration tools, although it was helped by the fact its products typically needed little "tweaking" – they just ran.

==== Corporate ethos and "coopetition" ====
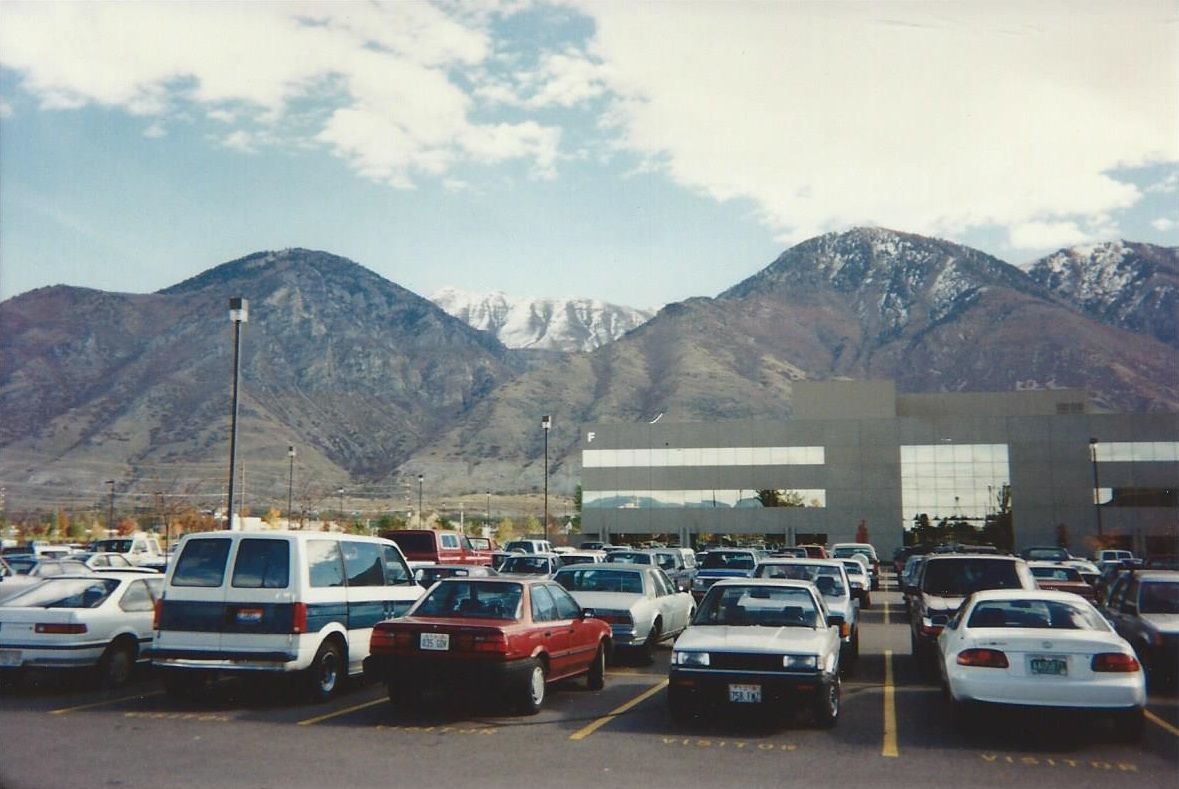
Novell's Building F in Provo in 1994, part of a large complex of Novell buildings once there, with the Wasatch Range in the background

By early 1985, Novell was rapidly expanding, but many people were still unaware of either it or the role that local area networks could play, and consequently Noorda referred to Novell as "the most misunderstood company in the world." Nonetheless, in 1986 The Salt Lake Tribune was hailing Novell as another Utah success story in technology, likely to follow in the footsteps of Evans & Sutherland and Iomega. Novell was quickly outgrowing its original site in Orem, with some employees forced to work in trailers. A new, much larger site for the company was found in nearby Provo, Utah and construction was begun; by late 1986, employees were moving into the first building there while work on a second building was already underway. Eventually between 1986 and 1993 six buildings would be constructed for Novell's use there.

We don't even have an industry; we have to build an industry.

— Ray Noorda, 1985,

Under Noorda, Novell embraced the notion of "coopetition", or cooperative competition. The central idea was that whatever was good for networking in general would be good for Novell and took the form of encouraging the growth of an ecosystem composed of hundreds of suppliers of hardware and software networking products, even if some of those suppliers had products that competed with Novell's. 3Com, who had been an early competitor of Novell's, sold more instances of their Ethernet networking cards for use in conjunction with NetWare than they did for use with their own 3+Share network operating systems, and a similar situation existed for IBM and their Token Ring cards. It was due to this kind of industry vision that Noorda would become known as the "Father of Network Computing".

From the first years of the new Novell's success, Noorda was credited in the press with forging that path. The company reflected aspects of Noorda's personal background, such as his Mormon religion, which brought about what was termed "the Mormon work ethic" at Novell. As one account later put it, Novell was "reputedly staffed with lots of hard-selling but soft-drinking Mormons." Noorda himself was famous for his frugal ways and for working from a plain, small office.

In 1989 senior executives Craig Burton and Judith Clarke, whom many credited for much of Novell's past success, left Novell. Burton had been seen as Noorda's most likely successor while Judith Clarke had been instrumental in marketing and positioning Novell.

In April 1990, Novell and Lotus Development Corporation announced merger of equals based on a $1.5-billion stock swap that would have been the largest deal in the software industry to that time. But it collapsed the following month: when Lotus head Jim Manzi refused to give Novell an equal number of seats on the new board, Noorda pulled out shortly before the deal would have been completed.

At its high point around 1993, NetWare had a roughly two-thirds share of the market for network operating systems; one analysis put the figure at 63 percent. There were over half a million NetWare-based networks installed worldwide and some 55 million NetWare users on those networks. And networking itself was the fastest-growing segment of the computer market, increasing by 30 percent a year and reaching a $10 billion figure by 1993. Novell was the second largest maker of software for personal computers, trailing only Microsoft. Novell's employee base, which had been around 15 when Noorda joined, had risen to 4,335 by the end of 1993. Besides Utah, Novell continued to grow in San Jose, where many of the sales, marketing, product management, and executive functions were located.

==== Sales and channel practices ====
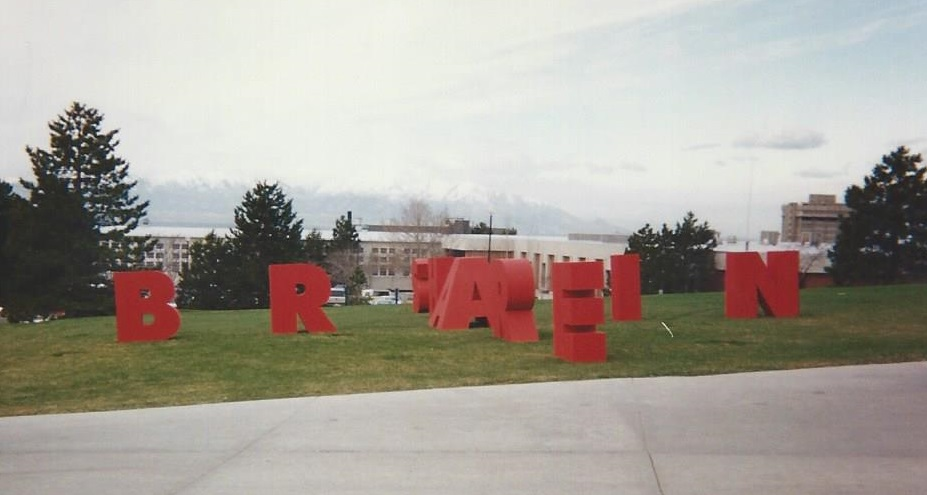
The annual Novell BrainShare conference, seen here with its entrance letters in 1995, helped spread the word about how developers and partners could make use of NetWare.

Equally important as technological factors to NetWare's growth was that Novell did not try to hire a large sales force to do direct sales of the product, but instead sold it through a broad channel of some 13,000 value-added resellers. Such resellers provided network education, installation, and subsequent maintenance, and included CompUSA and Egghead Software for very small businesses all the way up to sophisticated systems integrators like Andersen Consulting and Electronic Data Systems for enterprise-level projects. In this way Novell constructed a local area network franchise in literal terms, as Novell Authorized Education Centers were set up on a franchising basis. Credentialization programs were in place, such that becoming a Certified NetWare Engineer was an important step, one that could be furthered with levels such as Master Certified NetWare Engineer. As one industry analyst said, "They've done a wonderful job of farming distribution out. They train people who go out and train other people, and every time somebody gets trained, they get another Netware bigot, and make another dollar. They are getting paid to have people go out and be evangelists." The partnering approach also worked well in overseas markets, such as in Japan where Novell set up a subsidiary that major Japanese electronics firms invested in, or in South America and Eastern Europe where Novell set up authorized distributors.

Under Ray Noorda's leadership, Novell provided upgrades to resellers and customers in the same packaging as a newly purchased copy of NetWare, but at one third the cost, which created a gray market that allowed NetWare resellers to sell upgrades as newly purchased NetWare versions at full price periodically, which Novell intentionally did not track. Noorda commented to several analysts that he devised this strategy to allow front line resellers to "punch through" the distributors like Tech Data and Ingram and acquire NetWare versions at a discounted rate, as Novell "looked the other way"; this helped fund the salaries of Novell Field Support Technicians, who for the most part were employees who worked for the front line resellers as Novell CNE (Certified NetWare Engineers). Noorda commented that this strategy was one he learned as an executive at General Electric when competing against imported home appliances: allow the resellers to "make more money off your product than someone else's".

=== Challenging Microsoft ===
==== Motivations ====
Noorda was nearing 70 years of age by the early 1990s, much older than peers in the computer industry. Furthermore, he was known for alienating high-level executives who might someday be in position to run the company. Stock market analysts were expressing concern that Noorda, whose personality was the basis for much of the company's culture, had no succession plan. At the same time, Novell faced a looming challenge from Microsoft's upcoming Windows NT operating system, which, after a huge investment of resources from Microsoft, featured bundled networking and more advanced OS capabilities and looked to be that company's first offering that could seriously challenge Novell's local area networking franchise.

Under Noorda, Novell made a series of acquisitions which were often interpreted as a direct challenge to Microsoft. Noorda was motivated in part by a realization that NetWare's technology was not suitable as the basis for a full-fledged operating system and application platform. There was also enmity between the two companies and the two CEOs, stemming in part from intermittent merger talks between Noorda and Microsoft head Bill Gates that had begun in 1989 before the idea was abandoned. Subsequently, Novell had played a role in keeping the Federal Trade Commission investigation into Microsoft going.

Between 1991 and 1994, the Noorda-led Novell made this series of major acquisitions: Digital Research Inc., producer of DR-DOS, to compete with Microsoft's MS-DOS; Unix System Laboratories (USL), holder of Unix operating system technology, to improve Novell's technology base versus Windows NT; Serius Corp., maker of an advanced application development tool; and WordPerfect Corporation and Quattro Pro from Borland to provide personal productivity and group collaboration products. In all, Noorda acquired ten companies within a four-year span. By September 1993, BusinessWeek was writing, "Of the many rivalries in the personal-computer industry, for sheer nastiness it's hard to beat the one between Microsoft Corp. and Novell Inc." In November 1993, Noorda confirmed published reports that he had been suffering from some memory lapses and announced that he would be stepping down from the CEO position once a successor was found.

In April 1994, former HP executive Robert Frankenberg was announced as the new CEO of Novell. Noorda remained as chairman of the board of directors. By then the USL acquisition was already showing difficulties, while the WordPerfect acquisition was questioned even more. Nonetheless, Frankenberg said he was enthusiastic about it: "For me, it was a pivotal item in my decision to join Novell because it makes possible an entirely new category of networked applications which no one else can provide." When the WordPerfect and Quattro Pro acquisitions closed in June 1994, it was the largest such deal in the software industry to that time; it made Novell the third-largest software company in the world, trailing only Microsoft and Computer Associates.

Noorda retired from the chairman position and left Novell completely in November 1994, although he was still the largest shareholder of the company. Frankenberg became chairman as well.

==== Desktop OS and embedded systems: DOS, NEST, and Corsair ====
Novell acquired Digital Research for US$80 million in June 1991. The move was seen as a way for Novell to supply software for server-focused PCs in alternative to Microsoft. NetWare used DR DOS as a boot loader and maintenance platform, and Novell intended to extend its desktop presence by integrating networking into DR DOS and providing an alternative to Microsoft's Windows. At first, the idea was to provide a graphical environment based on Digital Research's GEM, but Novell's legal department rejected this due to apprehension of a possible legal response from Apple, so the company went directly to Apple starting Star Trek in February 1992, a project to run an x86-port of their Mac OS on top of a multitasking DR DOS.

Novell had already abandoned Digital Research's Multiuser DOS in 1992. The three former Master Value Added Resellers (VARs) DataPac Australasia, Concurrent Controls and Intelligent Micro Software could license the source code to take over and continue independent development of their derivations in 1994.

By 1994, Corsair was a project run by Novell's advanced technology group that sought to put together a desktop metaphor with Internet connectivity and toward that end conducted research on how to better and more easily integrate and manage network access for users. At the time, the Internet was dominated by Unix-based operating systems, but the Novell group saw the Unixes of the day as being too hardware intensive, too large, and charging too much in license fees. They became convinced that Linux offered the best possible answer for the operating system component, and started building code towards that purpose, including contributing work on IPX networking for NetWare and Wine compatibility layer for Windows.

Digital Research's FlexOS had been licensed to IBM for their 4690 OS in 1993 and was also utilized for the in-house development of Novell's Embedded Systems Technology (NEST), but was sold off to Integrated Systems, Inc. (ISI) for US$3 million in July 1994. The deal comprised a direct payment of half this sum as well as shares representing 2% of the company.

NEST however held importance for Frankenberg's vision of "pervasive computing", wherein Novell software would be connecting a billion nodes by 2000. Many of those nodes would be common, everyday devices running NEST, linked by SuperNOS, Novell Directory Services, and other management services components.

Novell also abandoned their Corsair desktop project, and in late 1994 or early 1995 transferred some components to Caldera, a startup funded by Noorda's Canopy Group. The Canopy Group was a technology investment firm and real estate company that Noorda focused on after his departure from Novell.

Novell DOS (and all former DR DOS versions including StarTrek, PalmDOS and DOS Plus) as well as other remaining Digital Research assets (like GEM and the CP/M- and MP/M-based operating systems, programming languages, tools and technologies) were sold to Caldera on 23 July 1996. Personal NetWare had been abandoned at Novell in 1995 but was licensed to Caldera in binary form only. The deal consisted of a direct payment of US$400,000 as well as percentual royalties for any revenues derived from those assets to Novell.

In January 1997, Novell's NEST initiative was abandoned as well.

==== Server OS: UnixWare and SuperNOS ====
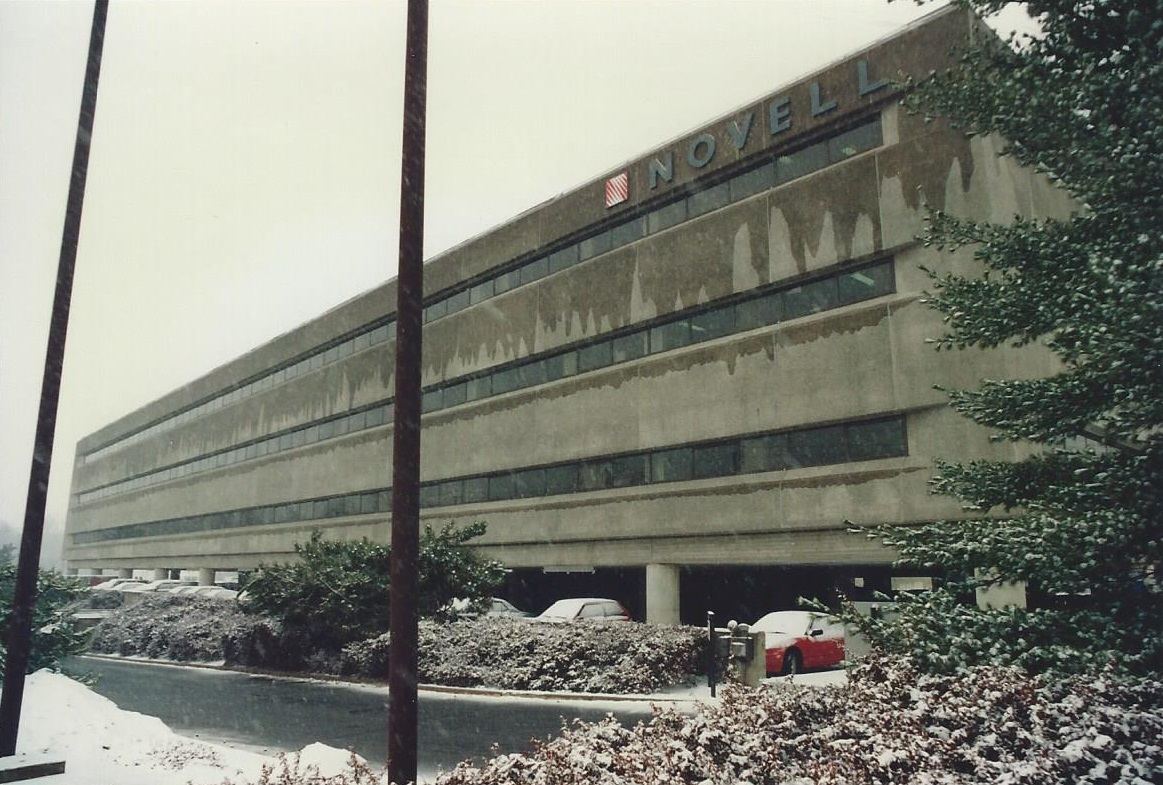
Novell's Summit, New Jersey, office, 1994 (formerly Unix System Laboratories)

On the server side, after their initial October 1991 Univel initiative, Novell announced in December 1992 that it was buying Unix System Laboratories (USL) from AT&T Corporation. The measure was intended to help Novell compete against Microsoft, which was on the verge of including networking as a built-in feature of Windows in conjunction with Windows NT server. Unix did present some attractive characteristics to the market, such as its abilities as an application server and the lack of vendor lock-in, but there were still considerable obstacles to be overcome in using it in this context.

The deal closed in June 1993, with Novell acquiring rights to the Unix SVR4 source base and the UnixWare operating system product. Novell then turned the Unix brand name and specification over to the industry consortium X/Open. Novell created the Unix Systems Group to contain the new business, which also absorbed the Univel venture. Most of the core USL employees remained in USL's Summit, New Jersey facility, which was later relocated to Florham Park, New Jersey in the summer of 1995. The USL Europe office in London was moved into Novell's facility in Bracknell, Berkshire.

Novell's time with Unix technology saw the release of UnixWare 1.1 in January 1994, in both personal and advanced server editions and with the bundled inclusion of TCP/IP, a NetWare Unix Client, and Merge functionality for running DOS and Windows 3.1 applications. This was followed in early 1995 by the release of UnixWare 2.0, which included full support for multiple processors as well as improved installation and ease-of-use and additional NetWare integration features.

In September 1994 Novell began publicly describing its plans to develop a "SuperNOS", a microkernel-based network operating system based on NetWare 4.1 and UnixWare 2.0. The aim was to include UnixWare technology inside NetWare, provide the strengths of both NetWare's network services and UnixWare's application services, be able to run existing NetWare Loadable Modules (NLMs) and Unix executables, and accordingly create a network operating system that could successfully compete with Microsoft's Windows NT. SuperNOS would also operate across distributed servers with unified presentation. Finally, SuperNOS would take advantage of object-oriented programming paradigms as a way of fostering easier application development.

In terms of operating system architecture, SuperNOS would run NLMs in kernel space, for maximum throughput, while it would run Spec 1170-based Unix applications in user space. For clustering, SuperNOS would embrace elements of a NetWare distributed parallel processing proposal and a UnixWare single system image initiative. SuperNOS was based on work that had already started at USL and at the French company Chorus Systèmes SA for cooperative work on the Chorus microkernel technology in the context of supporting SVR4 on a microkernel. This microkernel was arguably superior for this purpose than the more well-known Mach one, because it gave more flexibility at the kernel mode–user mode boundary. By mid-1995 the SuperNOS project was reportedly about one-third completed, with 1997 being seen as a customer release date for it. There were over 60 engineers assigned to it, mostly from the UnixWare and Chorus side. The project endured prolonged internal architectural debates and resistance from the NetWare side due to a reluctance to believe that Unix was really superior to NetWare in key aspects. In one instance, Novell's Drew Major and Chorus Systèmes' Michel Gien disagreed in the trade press about whether the existent Chorus technology was up to the task. The long-running disputes reflected cultural and political divisions between the San Jose (with Rekhi being a Unix supporter before leaving altogether) and Utah camps within Novell. In any case the 1997 date was seen by industry observers as being too late to forestall the market-share gains that Windows NT was already making.

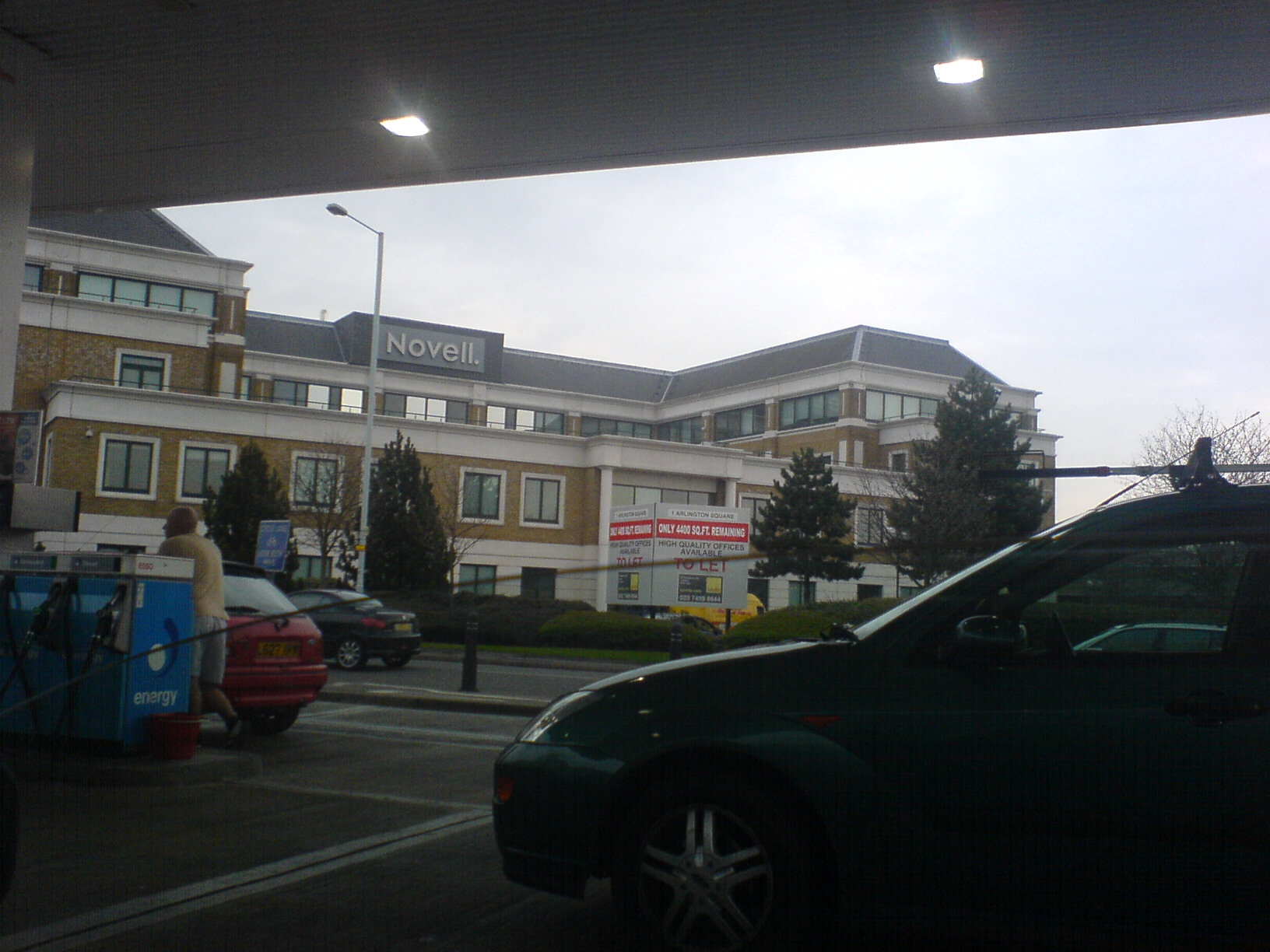
Novell had a development office in Bracknell, Berkshire, UK for many years (here seen in 2006).

Novell's acquisition as USL was not productive as hoped. During the company's fiscal years of 1993, 1994, and 1995, Novell's Unix Systems Group represented only about 5 percent of the company's revenue on an ongoing basis. Very few Certified NetWare Engineers ever reached a similar level of involvement with UnixWare. Another aim, that Novell might be able to coalesce Unix vendor versions and thus resolve the Unix wars, was not achieved either. By late summer 1995 the company was looking for a way out of the Unix business.

In September 1995, Novell announced the sale of UnixWare to the Santa Cruz Operation (SCO), coincident with a licensing arrangement with Hewlett-Packard. As part of the deal, SCO said that it would merge the SVR4.2-based UnixWare with its existing SVR3.2-based OpenServer operating system and add NetWare services to the new merged product, code-named "Gemini". Gemini would then be sold through SCO's well-known channel and reseller operation. As for HP, they said they would add NetWare code and NetWare Directory Services to their own version of Unix, HP-UX, in combination with Distributed Computing Environment elements, which would then be sold by HP's strong direct-sales force. Finally, SCO and HP said that they would co-develop a next-generation, 64-bit version of Unix. Some 400 Novell software engineers had been working on UnixWare; most of them were offered jobs with either SCO or HP, while a few remained with Novell.

While some lip service was paid to the notion that SuperNOS would go on after the three-way deal, in fact, it was abandoned and never achieved fruition in that form. (A decade later, Novell's Open Enterprise Server product would realize some aspects of a hybrid NetWare/Unix-like system, this time based around SUSE Linux Enterprise Server rather than UnixWare.)

By December, there were already some indications that the three-way arrangement was not working out as had been initially advertised. The computer industry was not sure that SCO could handle being the primary Unix shepherd. The HP project, code-named "White Box", focused on making a hybrid environment out of the SVR4.2-based Gemini and the SVR3.2-based HP-UX, but that effort faced major technical hurdles. The terms of the deal between Novell and SCO, which closed in December 1995, were uncertain enough that an amendment had to be signed in October 1996, and even that was not clear enough to preclude an extended battle between the two companies during the SCO-Linux disputes of the 2000s.

==== Tools: AppWare ====
In June 1993, Novell purchased Serius Corp., a firm that made a graphical programming language that could construct applications by connecting together icons representing objects in the program and their commands. Novell also purchased Software Transformations Inc., who made a cross-platform object code library that could be used to port conventional programs to a number of platforms. The disparate technologies of the two products were combined and renamed to AppWare, with the Serius product being called AppWare Visual AppBuilder, the objects it used AppWare Loadable Modules, and the Software Transformations library AppWare Foundation. The organization working on this was called the AppWare Systems Group. The founder of Serius, Joe Firmage, became vice president of strategy for Novell's Network Systems Group.

AppWare was one of the three main strategic focuses of Novell during this period, along with NetWare and UnixWare. These three prongs were intended to satisfy the growing need for scalable, distributed computing at the enterprise level of applications such as general ledger systems or reservation systems; as Novell executive Jim Tolonen outlined: "[NetWare] being the underlying infrastructure over which those mission critical transactions will be moved, Unix [being] a place on which the applications can run, and AppWare as tools that will help programmers write that class of application in a distributed environment."

It was not long before the AppWare plans started to fall apart. In September 1994 Novell announced they would be selling the Appware Foundation product to a third party. Novell did state that development of Visual AppBuilder would continue, and a Unix port would be following (that did not materialize). Novell also continued to release a number of new Appware Loadable Modules. But overall, as Byte magazine wrote in early 1995 about the three-pronged strategy, these "unrelated ... families of products formed an unsteady tripod".

Joe Firmage became disillusioned with Novell in mid-1995, following its decision to sell UnixWare and abandon the SuperNOS project, and left Novell later that year. Novell then publicly stated in November 1995 that it was looking for a buyer for AppWare. In March 1996, it was announced (based on an agreement that had been signed the month before) that Novell had sold all rights to the AppWare technology to a new company called Network Multimedia Inc., which was headed by Ed Firmage, who had been director of AppWare marketing at Novell.

==== Applications: WordPerfect, Quattro Pro, and GroupWise ====
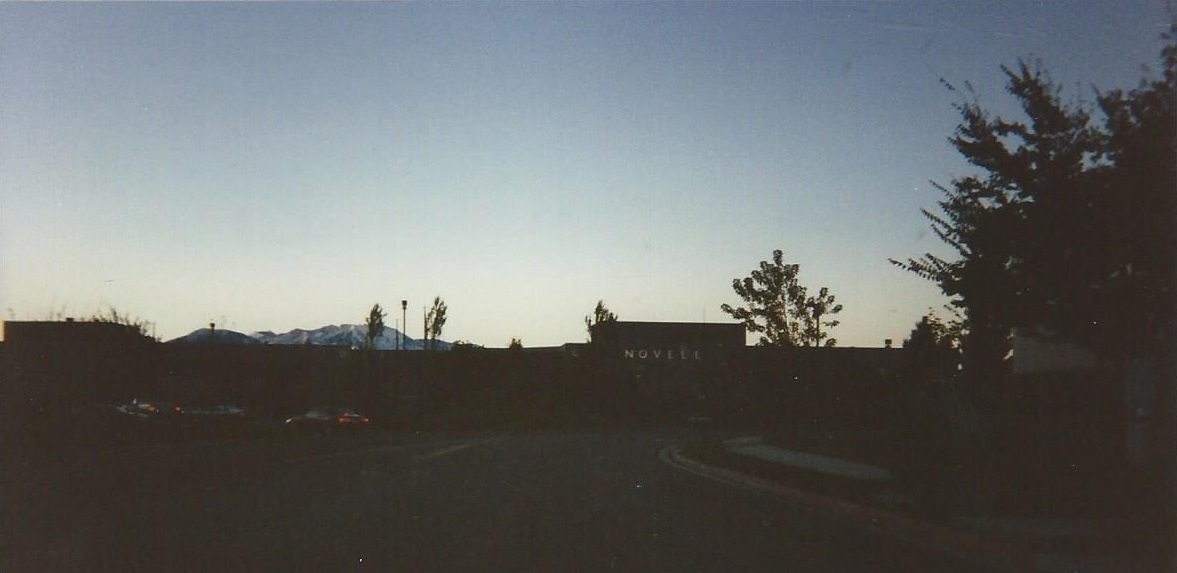
The WordPerfect building in Orem, Utah, with Novell signage, in 1994

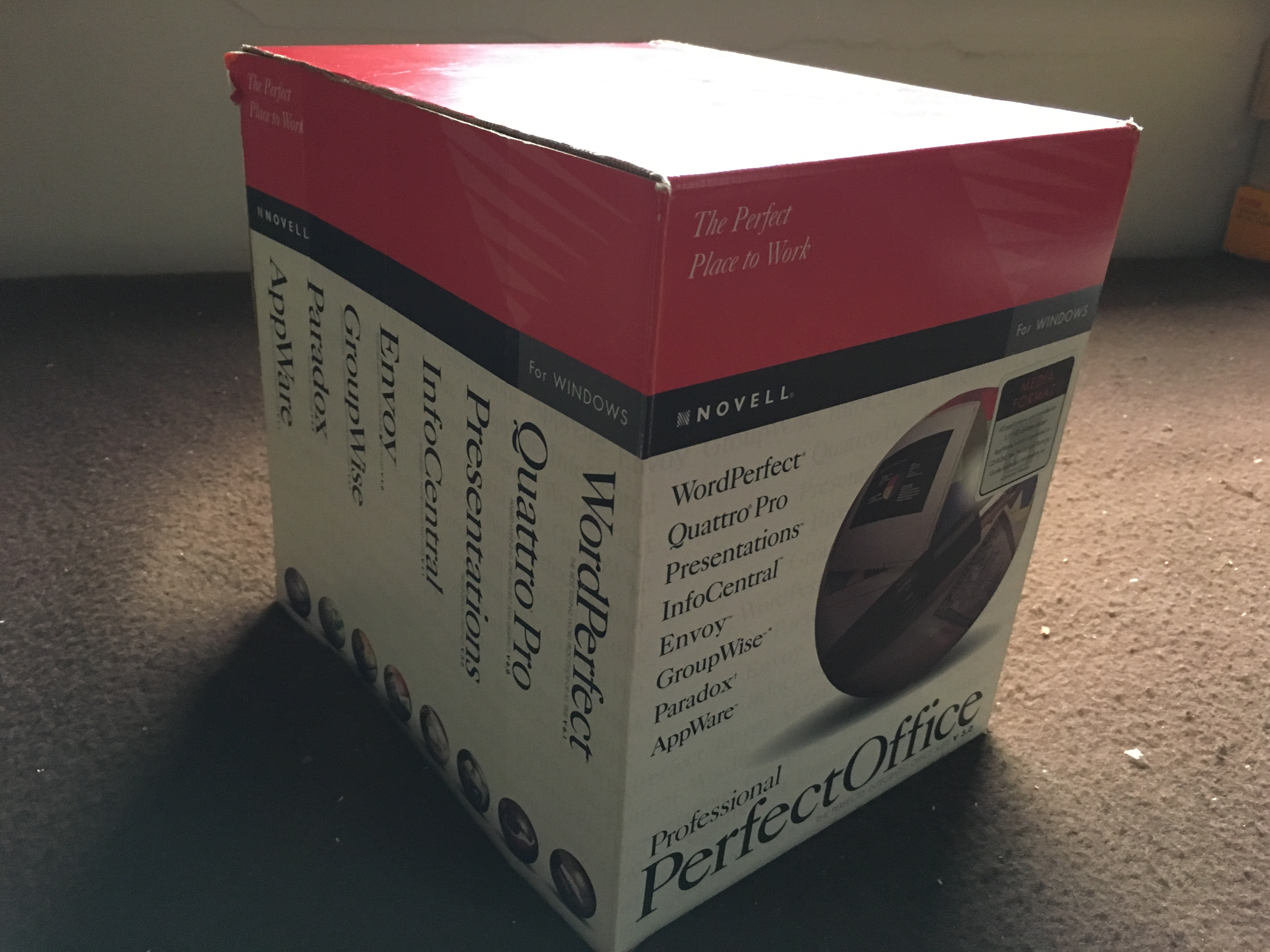
Novell's PerfectOffice suite, reflecting the purchases of WordPerfect and Quattro Pro

In March 1994, Novell announced that it was acquiring WordPerfect Corporation, whose primary product was the WordPerfect word processor, as well as acquiring the Quattro Pro spreadsheet from Borland. The initial price for WordPerfect was $1.4 billion in a Novell stock swap while Quattro Pro would cost $145 million in cash. Novell executives said the goal of the acquisitions was to build a suite of products that could be connected across the network via NetWare and UnixWare. The key to this was the idea of "groupware" for collaboration. Noorda said, "The era of stand-alone personal computing is evolving into group collaboration that connects individuals, groups and companies. Novell's objective is to accelerate this market transition." The geographical proximity, as well as the cultural similarity, between the two companies also made the acquisition seem like a good idea. The stock market was not enthusiastic about the deal and Novell's stock price slid steadily in value. The merger, and acquisition from Borland, both closed on June 24, 1994 (with the public announcement being made on June 27). Because the price for WordPerfect was measured in Novell stock, when the deal closed the cost of WordPerfect had become $855 million. Work on the acquired products was organized into the company's Application Group. Both before and after the acquisition, there were substantial layoffs of WordPerfect staff; at the peak right after the acquisition closed, Novell's employee count was around 10,150. Novell's corporate address was shifted to WordPerfect's Orem location for a while.

The market for standalone word processors and spreadsheets was expanding to that of office suites, where Microsoft Office had an early lead in marketshare. To compete, Novell PerfectOffice 3.0 was released in December 1994. It was based upon an earlier effort, Borland Office 2.0 for Windows, but had superior look-and-feel and integration. It contained not just WordPerfect and Quattro Pro but also other products, most of which had originated at WordPerfect Corporation, including Presentations for slides preparation, a personal information manager called InfoCentral, and the GroupWise collaboration product. There was also a professional edition that included AppWare as well as Borland's Paradox database. PerfectOffice surpassed in sales one early player in the space, Lotus SmartSuite, and GroupWise found three times the number of users as Lotus Notes. The application products also had the advantage of what Novell's senior vice president for corporate marketing, Christine Hughes, called "[an] 'in your face' presence for the user. Otherwise no one is aware it's Novell providing that connection." But industry analyst reaction was that while PerfectOffice 3.0 was a good product, it was arriving too late to head off Microsoft Office's momentum.

WordPerfect also played in a role in larger architectural ambitions within Novell, as WordPerfect incorporated OpenDoc and IBM System Object Model technology. These became part of the basis for Novell's larger distributed object strategy. That strategy was tied to having supporting multiple object request brokers that could tie in NetWare Loadable Modules, the AppWare Bus, UnixWare, and eventually SuperNOS itself. WordPerfect itself was also supposedly using the AppWare foundation layer in its work. Other parts of WordPerfect were deemed less strategic, and the Main Street line of multimedia products for children was dropped.

During its time in Novell, WordPerfect still sold reasonably well as standalone software, garnering almost half of all such word processor sales; but the market was increasingly dominated by the idea of office suites, and there Microsoft Office was supreme, with 86 percent of the market compared to only 5 percent for Novell's PerfectOffice. As such, the WordPerfect and Quattro Pro part of the company dragged down Novell's earnings and stock price.

Novell stated in November 1995 that it was putting its personal productivity product line up for sale. Then in January 1996 it announced that the sale of these products, primarily WordPerfect and Quattro Pro, would be made to Corel for $186 million, a large loss from the $855 million that it had originally paid to acquire WordPerfect. Novell did hold onto a few pieces that it had acquired from WordPerfect, most importantly the GroupWise collaboration product. By some estimates Novell had lost $750 million on the WordPerfect experience. The sale to Corel was completed in March 1996.

==== Results ====
Overall, none of these moves had worked out well – for instance, Novell suffered a net loss of $35 million for its 1993 fiscal year, largely due to write-offs for the acquisitions, and under criticism from Wall Street, Novell's stock price underwent a prolonged downturn – and many of the companies and products that had been purchased were subsequently sold off. Novell did have its two largest revenue years in 1994 and 1995, generating $1.998 billion and $2.041 billion in sales respectively. But the Noorda-era acquisitions were short-lived.

The business press was negative on the whole attempt: The New York Times referred to "acquisitions Mr. Noorda had made in his latter years in a disastrous attempt to compete head-on with Microsoft", while the San Francisco Chronicle talked of "a disastrous acquisition spree undertaken by previous CEO Ray Noorda in an effort to compete with Microsoft." By the year 2000, The Age would say that "The WordPerfect acquisition was the biggest disaster in software history".

Novell continued to have mediocre-at-best financial results during 1995 and 1996. In August 1996, Frankenberg himself departed Novell in what was variously portrayed as a mutual decision, or as a resignation under pressure from the company's board of directors. His 2 1/2 years there had been marked by having to disassemble Noorda's acquisitions but also by failing to fully recognize the growing importance of the Internet for networking applications.

=== Loss of networking dominance ===
==== NDS and other new products ====
Novell's core products did not stay idle during this challenging-of-Microsoft time, as work in the company's NetWare Systems Group continued. One of Novell's major innovations was Novell Directory Services (NDS), later known as eDirectory. It was based on the CCITT X.500 standard and supported the notion of a distributed directory. Introduced with NetWare 4.0 in 1993, NDS replaced the old Bindery server and user management technology employed by NetWare 3.x and earlier. Directory services were seen as a crucial strategic key to staying relevant in the networking marketplace. It was also one where Novell had a lead over Microsoft, as the latter's Active Directory was not yet out.

Then with UnixWare gone, Novell focused on major upgrades to its core NetWare-based network operating system. The initial release of NetWare 4 came with compatibility problems for some NetWare 3 users, and large enterprises were faced with an upgrade-all-or-upgrade-none decision. However some 40 million users declined to move to NetWare 4, with the result that Novell lost large amounts of possible revenue in upgrades. Although the NetWare 4.1 release of 1995 sought to remedy some of these issues, the lag had caused many Novell customers to take a serious look at Windows NT. And Windows NT was proving better as a platform for application and database services than NetWare. Furthermore, Microsoft was having success with its no-extra-charge bundling of Microsoft's IIS web server on NT, while Novell's presence in the Internet market was severely lacking. Still, as of 1996, by one estimate there were three million networks, and tens of millions of PCs, still using NetWare.

In 1996, the company began a move into Internet-enabled products, replacing reliance on the proprietary IPX protocol in favor of a native TCP/IP stack. Support for the new Java programming language also began to be added to NetWare. An Internet-focused product released during 1996 was called Intranetware.

These moves were accelerated when Eric Schmidt became CEO in April 1997, the first in the post since Frankenberg's departure; Christopher Stone was brought in as senior vice president of strategy and corporate development, reporting to Schmidt. Many observers were surprised that Schmidt would leave his chief technical officer position at Sun Microsystems, which at the time was doing very well, to go to Novell, which was viewed as a company in real trouble. The new CEO said, "Novell has been defocused by a series of acquisitions and forays that didn't work out. In this collaborative world, it's more important to do a few things well and just go for them like you've never seen."

One result of these shifts was BorderManager, released in August 1997, which supplied proxy server, firewall, and other services for connecting NetWare networks to the Internet. Another was a new version of NDS, that was capable of running with Windows NT, not just NetWare. And still another was NetWare 5.0, released in October 1998, with hopes for it accelerating Novell's improved fortunes under Schmidt. NetWare 5.0 leveraged and built upon eDirectory and introduced new functions, such as Novell Cluster Services (NCS, a replacement for SFT-III) and Novell Storage Services (NSS), a replacement for the traditional Turbo FAT filesystem used by earlier versions of NetWare. While NetWare 5.0 introduced native TCP/IP support into the NOS, IPX was still supported, allowing for smooth transitions between environments and avoiding the "forklift upgrades" frequently required by competing environments. Similarly, the traditional Turbo FAT file system remained a supported option.

==== Decline of marketshare ====
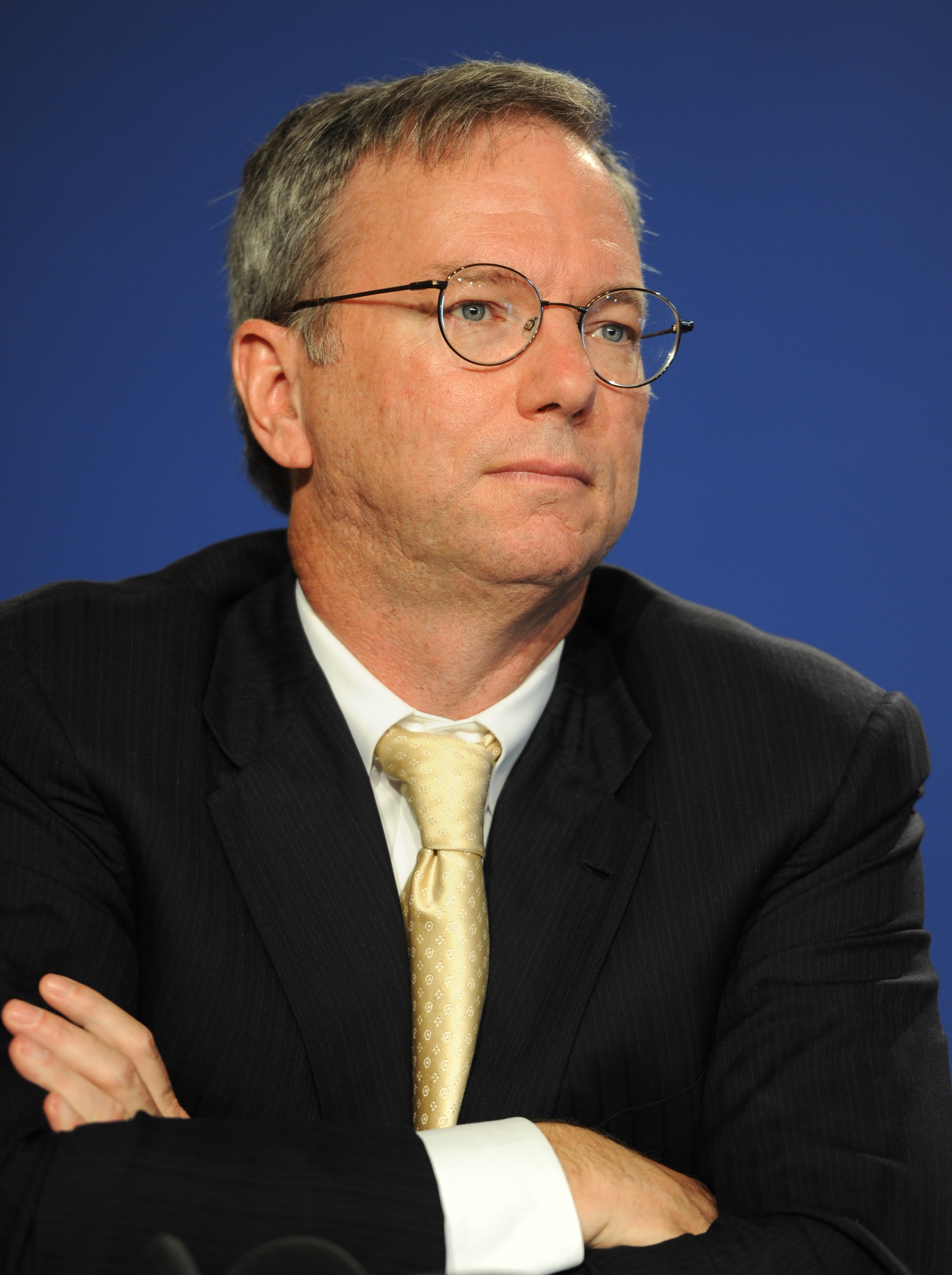
Eric Schmidt, CEO of Novell from 1997 to 2001

The inclusion of networking as a core system component in all mainstream PC operating systems after 1995 led to a steep decline in Novell's market share. Unlike Windows 3.1 and its predecessors, Windows NT, Windows 95, Linux, and OS/2 all included network functionality which greatly reduced demand for third-party products in this segment. For instance, one mid-1996 survey of a thousand corporate users, conducted by Forrester Research, showed that 90 percent of them owned NetWare but only 20 percent said they had upgraded to the latest NetWare version and less than half of the users thought they would still be using NetWare three years hence. By March 1996, the company's stock price had fallen from a high of $33 a share in 1993 to a new low of under $12. Revenue declined from 1995 on. By 1997, Windows NT was winning 42 percent of new network operating system installations versus 33 percent for NetWare, and it was on the verge of overtaking NetWare even when upgrade sales were included. Overall, NetWare's market share had fallen to 26 percent and had been passed by Windows NT's 36 percent. Unix also had a significant share, and the free software Linux operating system had started to appear and make inroads as well.

With revenues in decline, Schmidt took actions to control costs, and some 18 percent of Novell employees were laid off during the first few months of his tenure. In addition he was forced to halt NetWare shipments to resellers because unsold inventory levels were so high. By the end of summer 1997, Schmidt was saying, "I took the job on the presumption that we would not have to do this. If I'd known what shape the company was in, I might not have taken it." While there was some speculation that Novell might relocate much of the company to its San Jose facility, Novell instead recommitted to Provo, building a new headquarters tower that opened in 2000.

But Novell's decline and loss of market share accelerated under Schmidt's leadership, with Novell experiencing an across-the-board decline in sales and purchases of NetWare and a drop in share price from US$40.00/share to US$7.00/share. Analysts commented that the primary reason for Novell's demise was linked to its channel strategy and mismanagement of channel partners under Schmidt.

Schmidt embarked on a channel strategy to undo Noorda's "look the other way" approach and thereby remove the upgrades as whole box products, then directed Novell's general counsel to initiate litigation against a large number of Novell resellers who were routinely selling upgrades as newly purchased NetWare versions. Although this move bolstered Novell's revenue numbers for several quarters, Novell's channels subsequently collapsed with the majority of Novell's resellers dropping NetWare for fear of litigation.

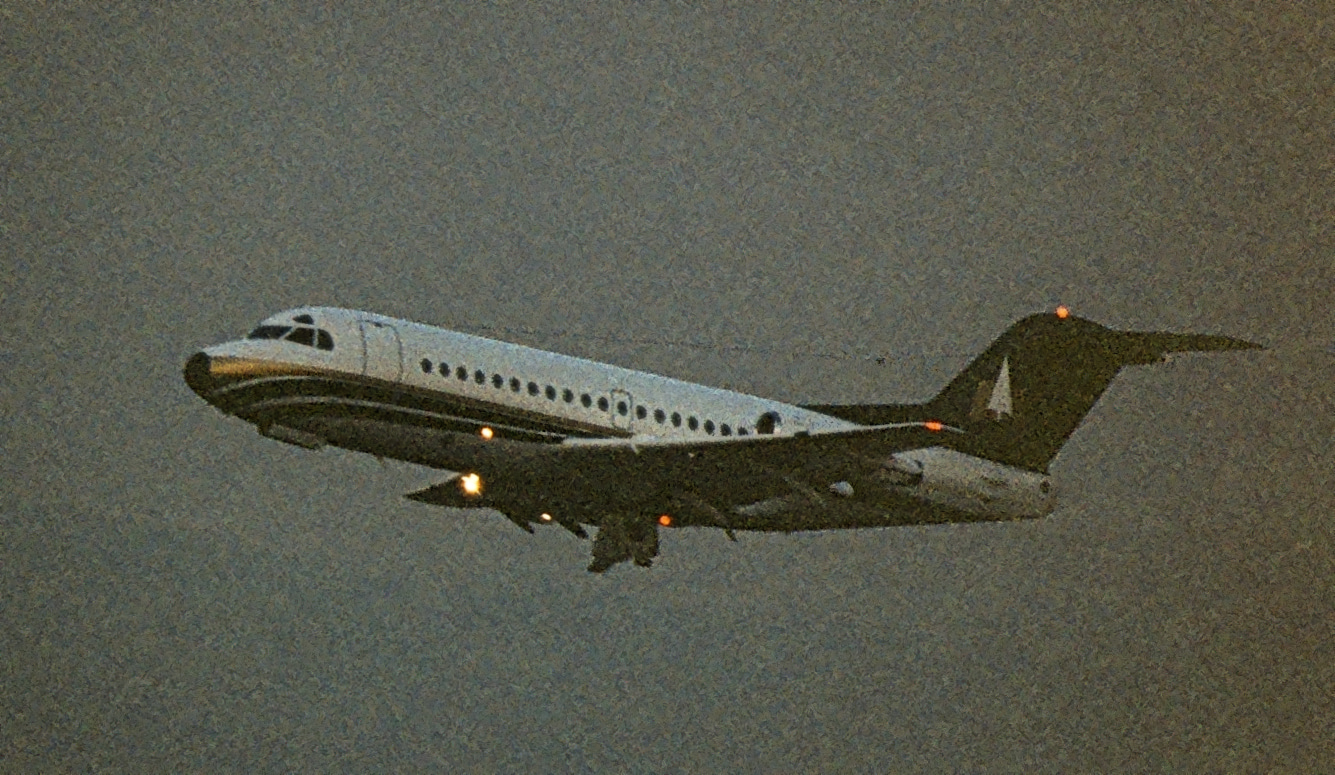
From 1998 to 2001, Novell owned this Fokker F28 Fellowship jet which it operated as a corporate shuttle aircraft, here seen taking off from San Jose bound for Provo.

By 1999, Novell had lost its dominant market position, and was continually being out-marketed by Microsoft as resellers dropped NetWare, allowing Microsoft to gain access to corporate data centers by bypassing technical staff and selling directly to corporate executives. Most resellers then re-certified their Novell CNE employees— the field support technicians who were Novell's primary contact in the field with direct customers—as Microsoft MCSE technicians, and were encouraged to position NetWare as inferior to Windows 2000 features such as Group Policy and Microsoft's GUI, which was considered to be more modern than the character-based Novell interfaces. With falling revenue, the company focused on net services and platform interoperability. Products such as eDirectory and GroupWise were made multi-platform.

By 2000, some large NetWare enterprise customers, such as Chase Manhattan Bank, United Parcel Service, and the University of Southern California were in the process of migrating most or all of their NetWare systems to alternatives. Revenue warnings during the second quarter of 2000 resulted in a 40 percent drop in the company's stock price. In October 2000, Novell released a new product, dubbed "DirXML", which was designed to synchronize data—typically user information—between disparate directory and database systems. This product leveraged the speed and functionality of eDirectory to store information, and would later become the Novell Identity Manager, forming the foundation of a core product set within Novell.

During Schmidt's tenure during the late 1990s, Novell developed and delivered a series of Internet-centric products that were well-reviewed. But these new products did not sell as well as the company had hoped, in part due to Novell channel issues with training, lead generation, and support. Indeed, there were reports of channel stuffing taking place. So despite its efforts in these other spaces, Novell was increasingly becoming irrelevant within the industry. Of Schmidt's efforts with Novell, News.com wrote, "He had traversed a rocky road as chief executive at Novell, briefly laying a smooth path for a renaissance at the aging network software provider before succumbing to strategy issues that have plagued it for years."

=== Cambridge Technology Partners ===
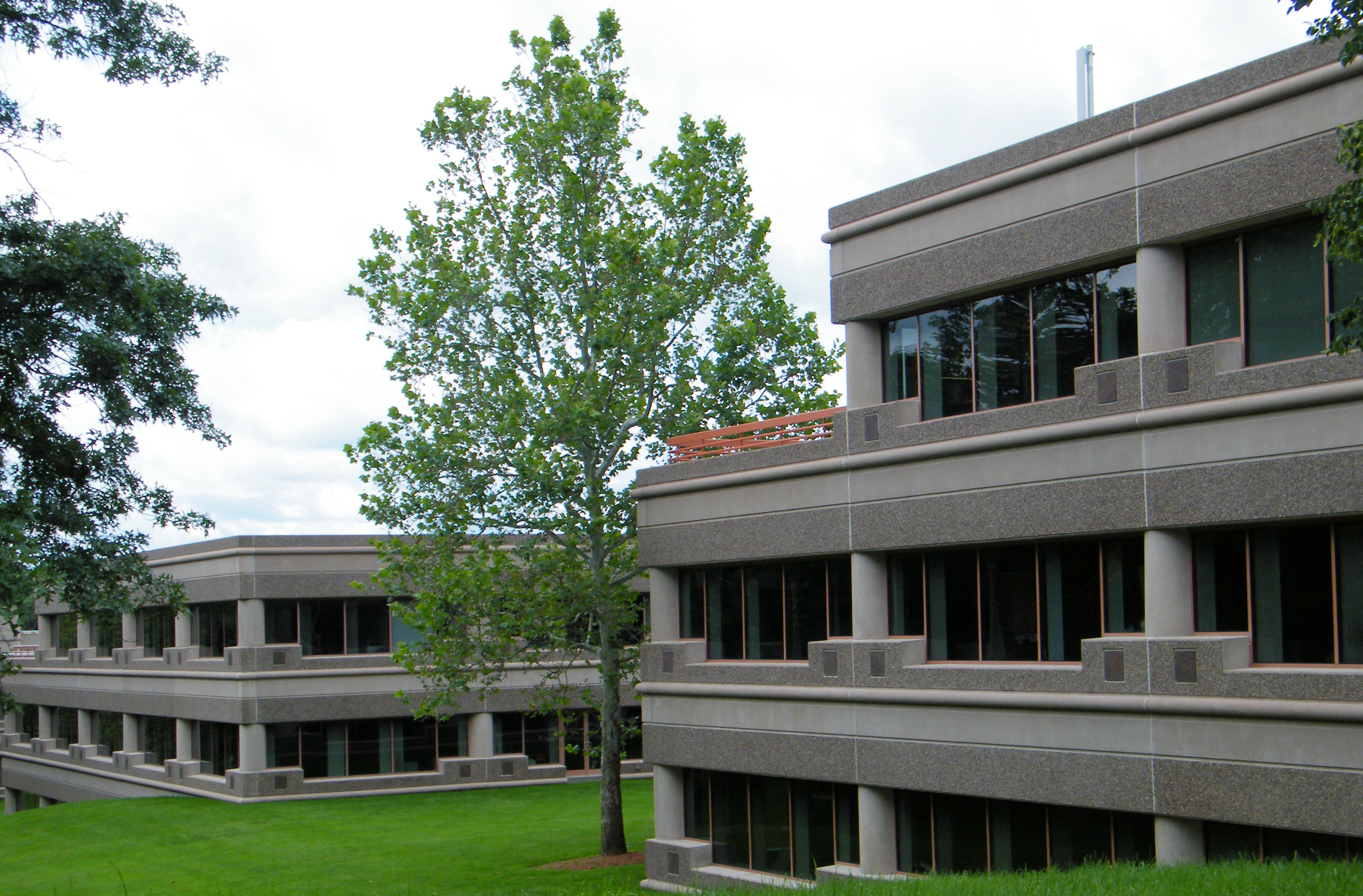
In the early 2000s Novell moved its headquarters to this building in Waltham, Massachusetts, following the acquisition of Cambridge Technology Partners.

In March 2001, it was announced that Novell was acquiring the consulting company Cambridge Technology Partners (CTP), founded in Cambridge, Massachusetts by John J. Donovan, to expand offerings into services. Novell felt that the ability to offer solutions (a combination of software and services) was key to satisfying customer demand. The merger was apparently against the firm's software development culture, and the finance personnel at the firm also recommended against it.

The CEO of CTP, Jack Messman, engineered the merger using his position as a board member of Novell since its inception, and as part of the deal became CEO of Novell. Chris Stone, who had left in 1999, was rehired as vice chairman to set the course for Novell's strategy into open source and enterprise Linux. With the acquisition of CTP, which closed in July 2001, Novell moved its headquarters to Massachusetts. As for Schmidt, he departed Novell soon after the CTP announcement and headed for Google, where he became chair of the board (and soon after that, CEO).

In July 2002, Novell acquired SilverStream Software, a leader in web services-oriented applications, but a laggard in the marketplace. Renamed to Novell exteNd, the platform comprised XML and web service tools based on Java EE.

=== Linux ===
==== SuSE and Open Enterprise Server ====
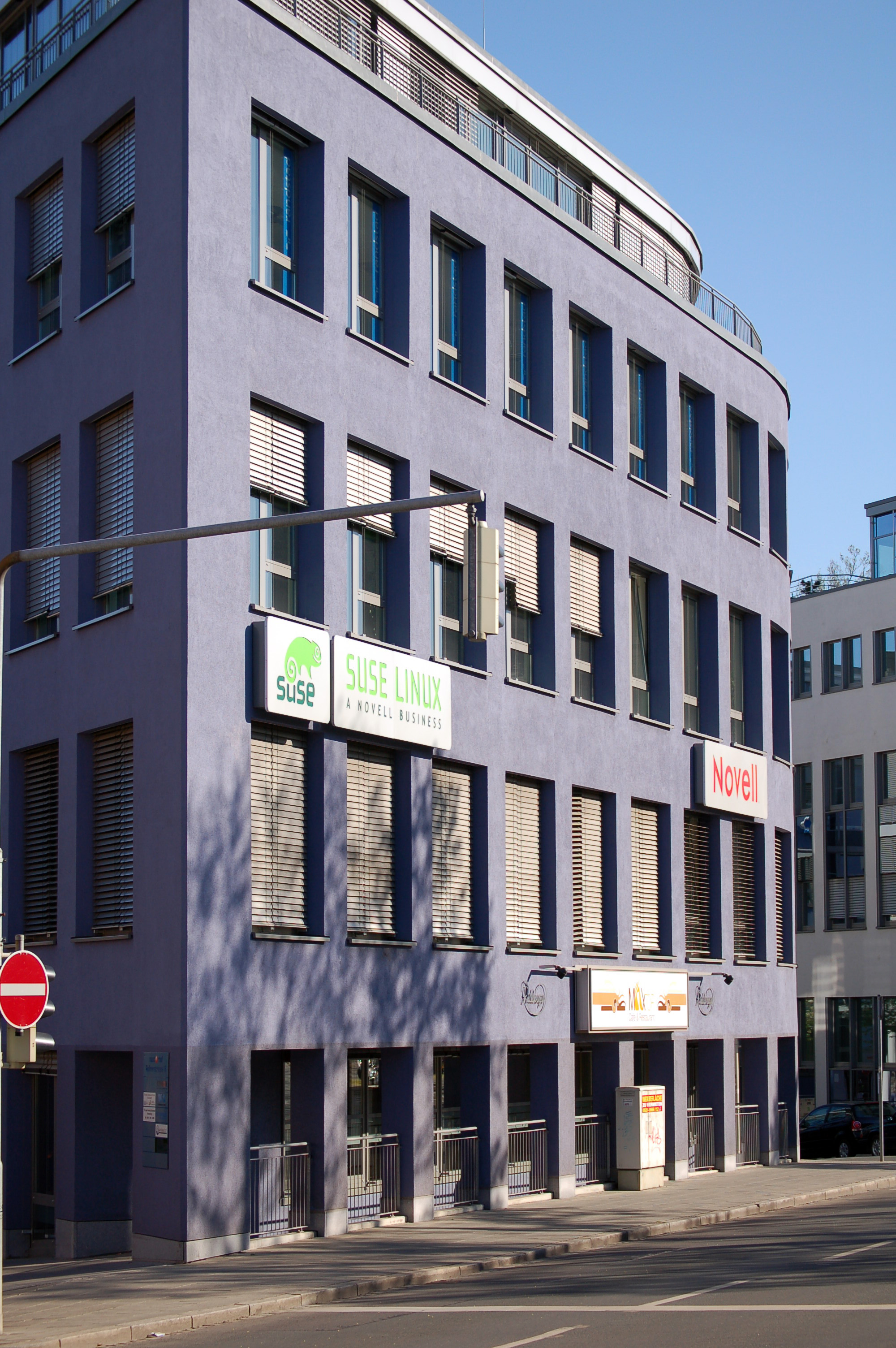
SuSE Linux headquarters and Novell office in Nuremberg in 2007

In August 2003, Novell acquired Ximian, a developer of open source Linux applications (Evolution, Red Carpet and Mono). This acquisition signaled Novell's plans to move its collective product set onto a Linux kernel.

In November 2003, Novell acquired Linux OS developer SuSE, which led to a major shift of power in Linux distributions. IBM also invested US$50 million to show support of the SuSE acquisition.

In mid-2003, Novell released "Novell Enterprise Linux Services" (NNLS), which ported some of the services traditionally associated with NetWare to SUSE Linux Enterprise Server (SLES) version 8. NetWare 6.5, released in 2003, would prove to be the last version of that product.

In November 2004, Novell released the Linux-based enterprise desktop Novell Linux Desktop 9, based on Ximian Desktop and SUSE Linux Professional 9.1. This was Novell's first attempt to get into the enterprise desktop market.

The successor product to NetWare, Novell Open Enterprise Server (OES), was released in March 2005. OES offers all the services previously hosted by NetWare 6.5, and added the choice of delivering those services using either a NetWare 6.5 or SUSE Linux Enterprise Server 9 kernel. The release was aimed to persuade NetWare customers to move to Linux.

In August 2005, Novell created the openSUSE project, based on SUSE Professional. openSUSE can be downloaded freely and is also available as boxed retail product.

==== Stagnation ====
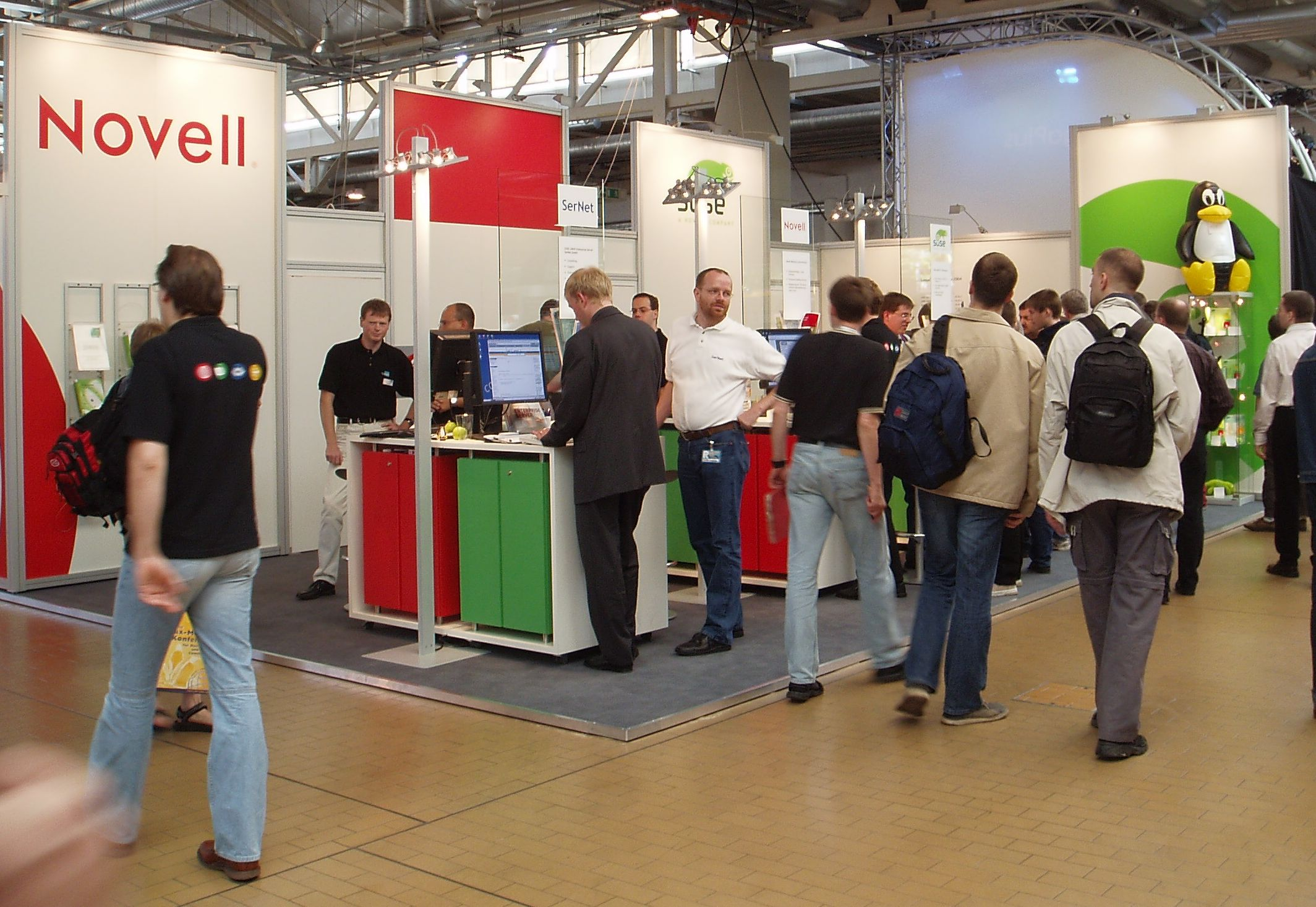
Novell with SuSE at the Invex expo in Brno, Czech Republic in 2006

From 2003 through 2005 Novell released many products across its portfolio, with the intention of arresting falling market share and to move away from dependencies on other Novell products, but the launches were not as successful as Novell had hoped. In late 2004, Chris Stone again left the company, after an apparent control issue with then CEO Jack Messman. In an effort to cut costs, Novell announced a round of layoffs in late 2005. While revenue from its Linux business continued to grow, the growth was not fast enough to offset the decrease in revenue of NetWare. While the company's revenue was not falling rapidly, it wasn't growing, either. Lack of clear direction or effective management meant that Novell took longer than expected to complete its restructuring.

In June 2006, chief executive Jack Messman and chief finance officer Joseph Tibbetts were fired, with Ronald Hovsepian, Novell's president and chief operating officer, appointed chief executive, and Dana Russell, vice-president of finance and corporate controller, appointed interim CFO.

==== "Your Linux is Ready" ====
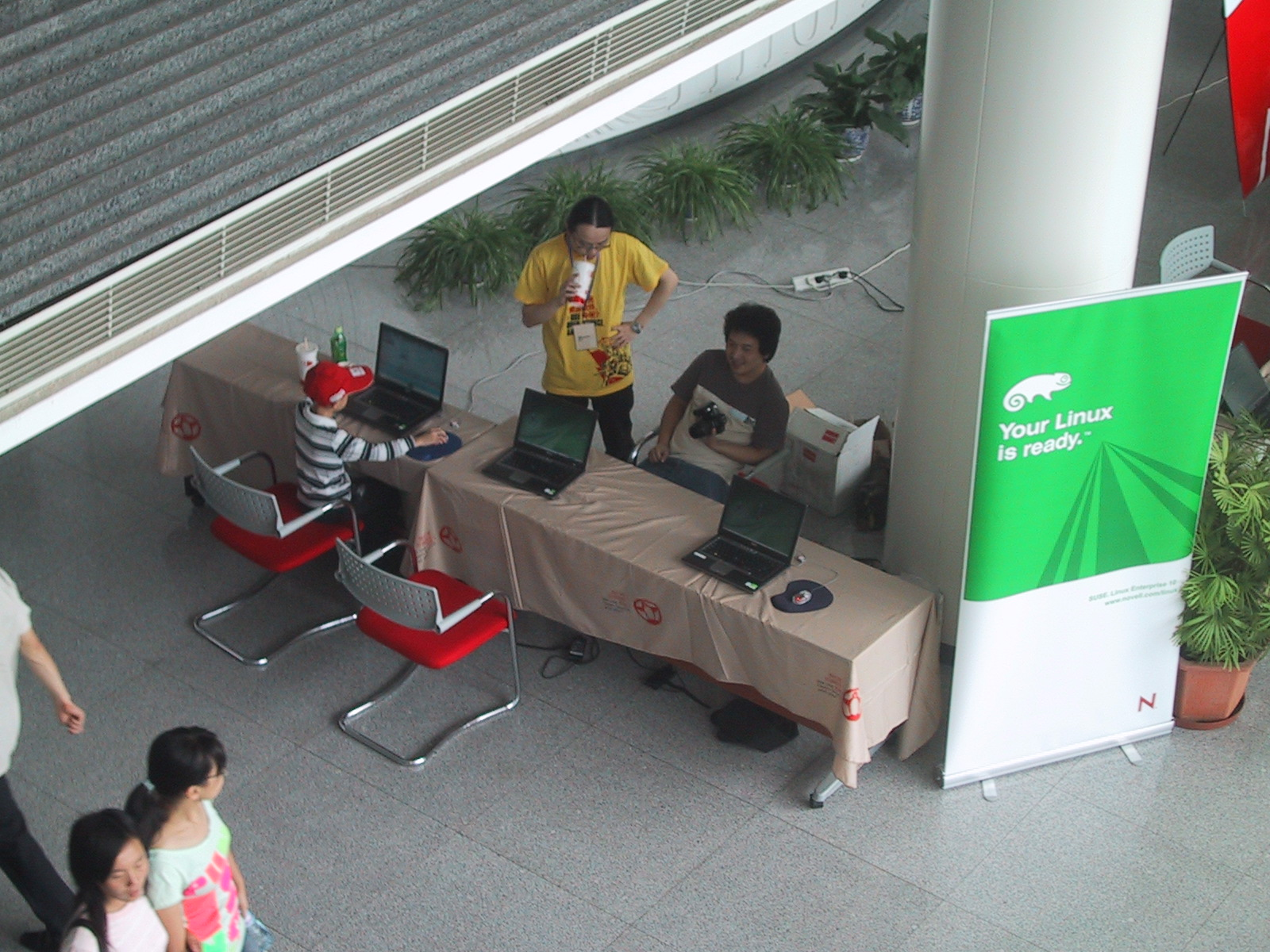
Novell's booth at a 2007 event in Beijing, showing slogan

In August 2006, Novell released the SUSE Linux Enterprise 10 (SLE 10) series. SUSE Linux Enterprise Server was the first enterprise class Linux server to offer virtualization based on the Xen hypervisor. SUSE Linux Enterprise Desktop (popularly known as SLED) featured a new user-friendly GUI and XGL-based 3D display capabilities. The release of SLE 10 was marketed with the phrase "Your Linux is Ready", meant to convey that Novell's Linux offerings were ready for the enterprise. In late September 2006 Novell announced a real-time version of SLES called "SUSE Linux Enterprise Real Time" (SLERT), based on technology from Concurrent Computer Corporation.

==== Legal actions and reactions ====
Beginning in 2003, Novell became a key player in the SCO–Linux disputes. The case SCO Group, Inc. v. Novell, Inc. revolved around the interpretation of the 1995 asset-transfer agreements between Novell and the Santa Cruz Operation, a predecessor company to The SCO Group – when Novell got out of the Unix business as part of abandoning its effort to take on Microsoft on all fronts – and a 1996 amendment that had attempted to clarify that agreement. The SCO Group believed that the transfer included ownership of, and copyrights for, the source code for the Unix operating system (which they in turn claimed Linux had infringed upon). Novell counter-sued, claiming that the asset-transfer agreements did not, in fact, transfer the intellectual property rights SCO sought.

The case attracted considerable industry and media attention, with the free and open-source software (FOSS) community solidly on the side of Novell. There were a series of court rulings, most of which went in Novell's favor and which sent The SCO Group into bankruptcy. The matter was settled finally in 2010 when a jury trial in Utah ruled that the copyrights belonged to Novell. (Novell made no material use of the Unix ownership once it was ruled theirs, as by then their interests were with SuSE Linux.)

In 2004, Novell sued Microsoft, asserting it had engaged in antitrust violations regarding Novell's WordPerfect business in 1994 through 1996. Novell's lawsuit was subsequently dismissed by the United States District Court in July 2012 after it concluded that the claims were without merit.

On 2 November 2006, the two companies announced a joint collaboration agreement, including coverage of their respective products for each other's customers. They also promised to work more closely to improve compatibility of software, setting up a joint research facility. Executives of both companies expressed the hope that such cooperation would lead to better compatibility between Microsoft Office and OpenOffice.org and better virtualization techniques.

Microsoft CEO Steve Ballmer said of the deal, "This set of agreements will really help bridge the divide between open-source and proprietary source software." The deal involved upfront payment of US$348 million from Microsoft to Novell for patent cooperation and SLES subscription. Additionally, Microsoft agreed to spend around US$46 million yearly, over the next 5 years, for marketing and selling a combined SLES/Windows Server offering and related virtualization solutions, while Novell paid at least US$40 million yearly to Microsoft, in the same period.

One of the first results of this partnership was Novell adapting the OpenXML/ODF Translator for use in OpenOffice.org.

Microsoft released two public covenants not to sue users of the open source Moonlight runtime—a workalike for the Microsoft Silverlight rich media platform—for patent infringement. One condition common to each covenant was that no Moonlight implementation be released under the GPLv3 free software license.

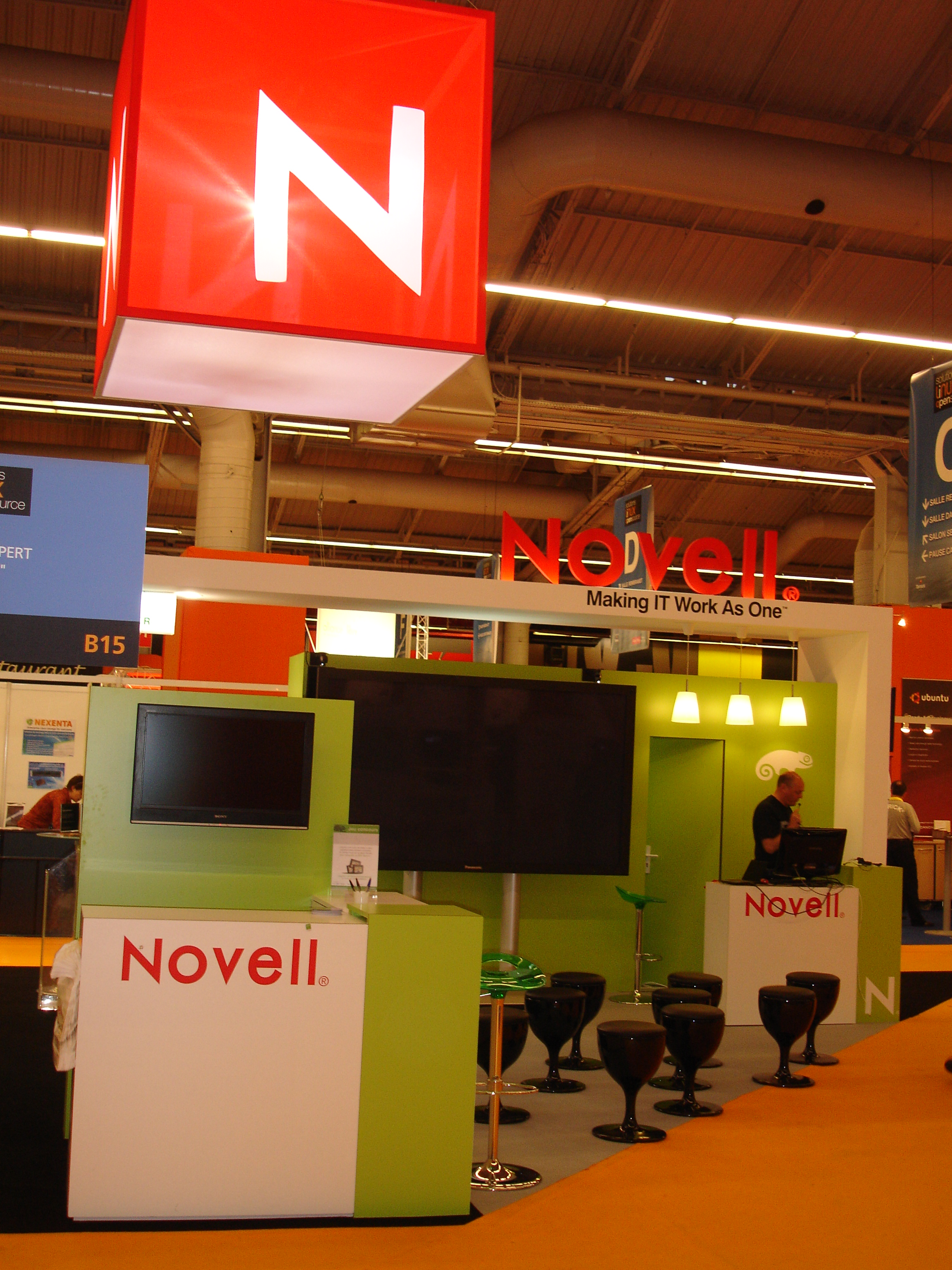
Despite controversy with some in the community, Novell persisted: its booth at Solutions Linux 2009 in Paris.

In contrast to the SCO case, here initial reaction from members of the free and open source software community over the patent protection was mostly critical, with expressions of concern that Novell had "sold out" and doubt that the GNU GPL would allow distribution of code, including the Linux kernel, under this exclusive agreement.

In a letter to the FOSS development community on 9 November 2006, Bradley M. Kuhn, CTO of the Software Freedom Law Center (SFLC), described the agreement as "worse than useless". In a separate development, the chairman of the SFLC, Eben Moglen, reported that Novell had offered cooperation with the SFLC to permit a confidential audit to determine the compliance of the agreement with the GPL (version 2). Richard Stallman, founder of the Free Software Foundation, said in November 2006 that changes coming with version 3 of the GPL would preclude such deals. When the final revision of the third version of the GPL license was decided, the deal between Microsoft and Novell was grandfathered in. A clause within GPLv3 allows companies to distribute GPLv3 software even if they have made such patent partnerships in the past, as long as the partnership deal was made before 28 March 2007 (GPLv3 Section 11 paragraph 7).

On 12 November 2006, the Samba team expressed strong disapproval of the announcement and asked Novell to reconsider. The team included an employee of Novell, Jeremy Allison, who confirmed in a comment on Slashdot that the statement was agreed on by all members of the team, and later quit his job at Novell in protest.

In early February 2007, Reuters reported that the Free Software Foundation had announced that it was reviewing Novell's right to sell Linux versions, and was considering banning Novell from selling Linux. However, spokesman Eben Moglen later said that he was quoted out of context, and was only noting that GPL version 3 would be designed to block similar deals in the future.

==== Intelligent workload management ====
In December 2009, Novell announced its intention to lead the market in intelligent workload management, with products designed to manage diverse workloads in a heterogeneous data center. Seeing this approach as a key to giving customers confidence in the area of cloud computing security, Novell restructured its business around the new initiative. Technologies from Novell's 2008 acquisition of Canadian company PlateSpin were involved. Key to this also was the use of SUSE Studio, an online Linux software creation tool through which users could develop their own Linux distribution, software appliance, or virtual appliance. Hovsepian said, "Cloud computing is a megatrend that matches the company's core competencies. ... We've developed our Suse appliance tool for application vendors [who have brand new applications being written or built for the cloud]. This product allows them to create a virtual appliance. They won't have to rewrite and retest the application once it is in the cloud and it allows firms to host their application on other clouds too." But Novell's approach would also support other cloud environments such as those based around Hyper-V, VMware, and Xen.

Partnerships in connection with intelligent workload management were announced with SAP, Citrix Systems, Ingres, and others. Reaction of industry analysts to the move varied, with some positive and some more mixed. Among the more skeptical was Dan Kusnetzky of ZDNet, who wrote that Novell "clearly hopes that putting its products together in new ways and invoking today's catch phrases and buzz words will appear fresh and new." While Novell did have strong technologies in this computing realm, it struggled to attract the same market attention that competing product lines from the likes of Microsoft or VMware held.

=== Acquisition by The Attachmate Group ===
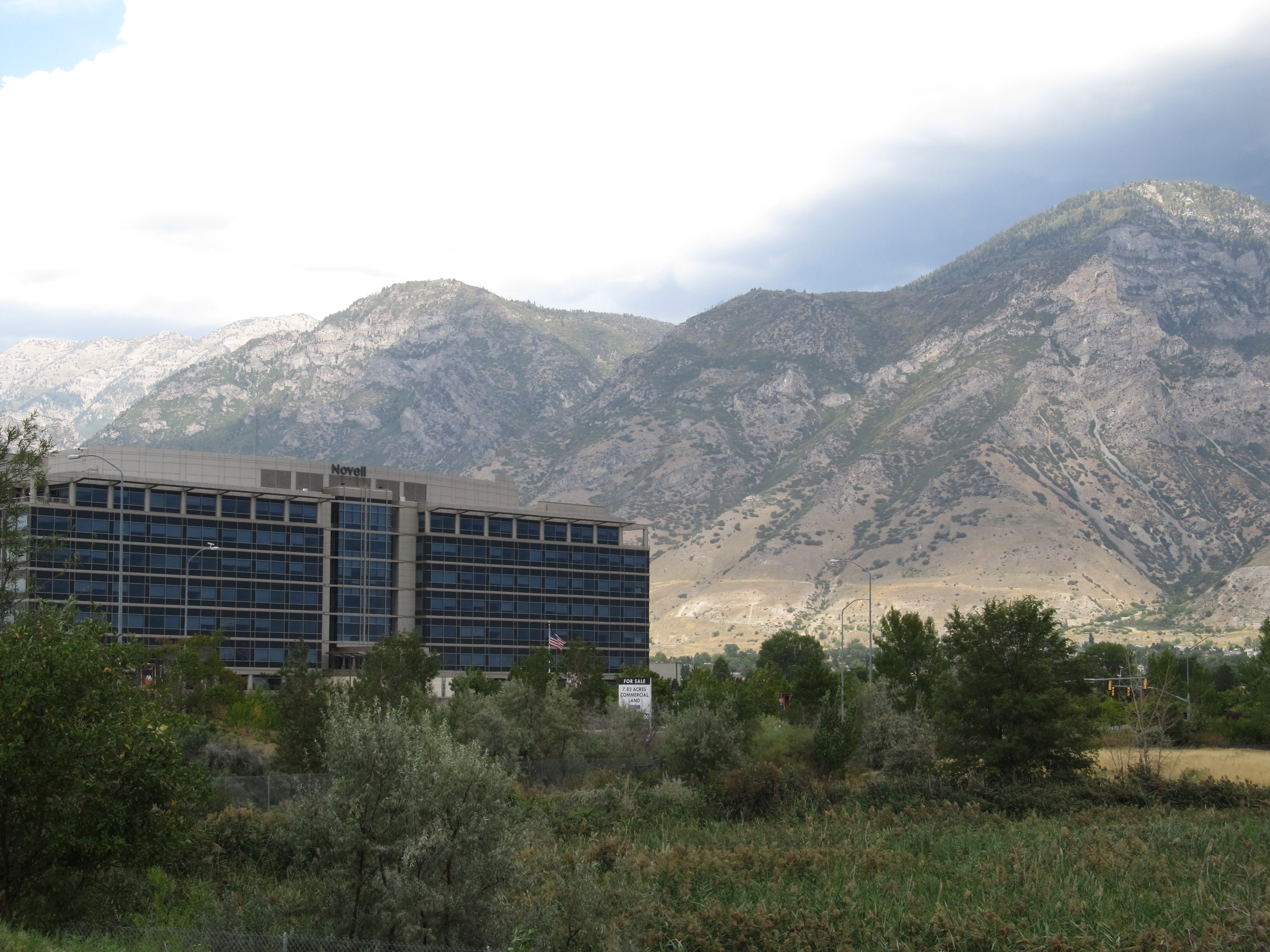
The main building in Provo in 2013 during the Attachmate Group era; the name Novell was kept on it. A 'For Sale' sign for some of the property can be seen in front of the building.

Novell had long been rumored to be a target for acquisition by a variety of other companies. In March 2010, Elliott Associates, L.P., an institutional investor with approximately 8.5% stock ownership of Novell, offered to acquire the company for US$5.75 per share in cash, or US$1 billion. The company declined the offer, saying that the proposal was inadequate and that it undervalued the company's franchise and growth prospects.

Novell announced in November 2010 that it had agreed to be acquired by The Attachmate Group for US$2.2 billion, and planned to operate Novell as two units, one being SUSE. As part of the deal, 882 patents owned by Novell were sold to CPTN Holdings LLC, a consortium of companies led by Microsoft and including Apple, EMC, and Oracle. According to Novell's SEC filing, the patents "relate primarily to enterprise-level computer systems management software, enterprise-level file management and collaboration software in addition to patents relevant to our identity and security management business, although it is possible that certain of such issued patents and patent applications read on a range of different software products". The Attachmate Group expressed in advance of the deal closing that there would no change to the relationship between the SUSE business and the openSUSE project. The merger completed in April 2011, with US$6.10 per share in cash being paid to acquire Novell. Novell became a wholly owned subsidiary of The Attachmate Group.

Concurrent with the closing of the acquisition, some of Novell's products and brands were transferred to another of the Attachmate Group business units, NetIQ, and the SUSE Linux brand was spun off as its own business unit. The fourth business unit, Attachmate, was not directly affected by the acquisition.

Immediately prior to merger being finalized, Novell completed the patent sale to CPTN Holdings for US$450 million. The U.S. Department of Justice announced that, as originally proposed, the deal with CPTN would jeopardize the ability of open source software, such as Linux, to continue to innovate and compete in the development and distribution of server, desktop, and mobile operating systems, middleware, and virtualization products; to address the department's antitrust concerns, CPTN and its owners had altered their original agreement:

- All of the Novell patents would be acquired subject to the GPLv2 open source license, and the Open Invention Network (OIN) license
- CPTN does not have the right to limit which of the patents, if any, are available under the OIN license
- Neither CPTN nor its owners will make any statement or take any action with the purpose of influencing or encouraging either Novell or Attachmate Group to modify which of the patents are available under the OIN license

With the acquisition, Novell's headquarters were moved back to Provo. But by then considerable consolidation had occurred, and the original six buildings of the Provo campus were sold. During April and May 2011, The Attachmate Group announced layoffs for the Novell workforce, including hundreds of employees from the Provo location, raising questions about the future of some open source projects such as Mono.

=== Acquisition by Micro Focus and OpenText ===
In September 2014, mainframe software company Micro Focus announced it was buying The Attachmate Group, including Novell, for US$1.2 billion. The acquisition closed on November 20, 2014, and the SUSE organization was split out separately from the rest of the former Novell organization within Micro Focus. SUSE was sold to EQT AB in 2019.

The Novell products themselves were relabeled and dispersed among the file and networking services, collaborations, and security product lines of Micro Focus, such that offerings like Open Enterprise Server, GroupWise, and ZENworks became billed as Micro Focus products with no mention of their Novell past. The one page at the Micro Focus website listing former Novell products did not even mention NetWare.

In January 2023, Micro Focus was in turn acquired by Canadian software company OpenText. Again, the former Novell products are listed within OpenText product groups without being identified as to their Novell past.

== Companies acquired ==
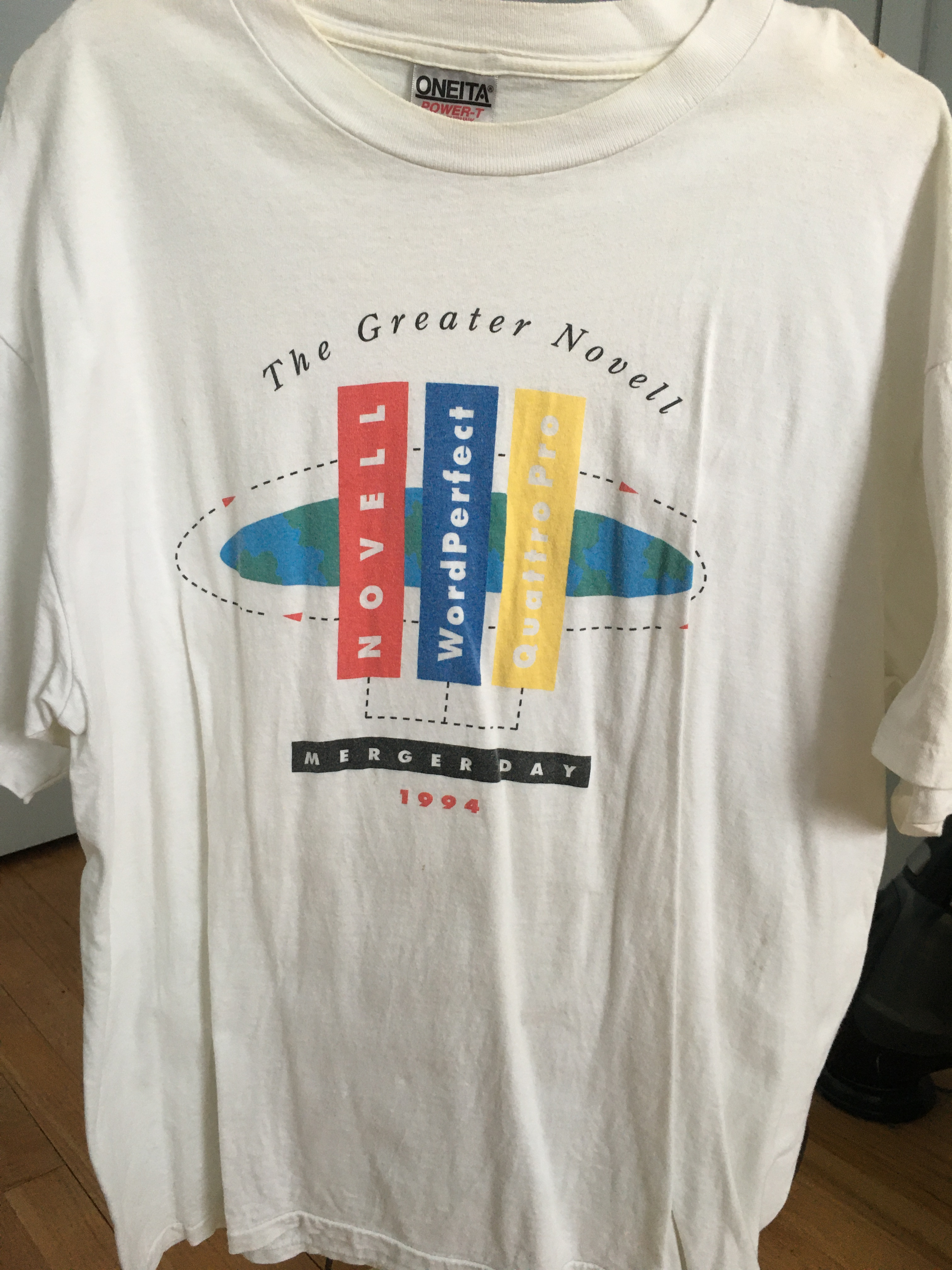
Internal company T-shirt celebrating acquisitions of WordPerfect and Quattro Pro

- Santa Clara Systems, Inc. (1986) for storage subsystems, network adapters, PCs
- Cache Data Product (1986)
- CXI (1987) for micro-to-mainframe software
- SoftCraft (1987) for Btrieve database and programming tools
- Indisy Software (1988/1990) for e-mail and message handling
- Excelan (1989) for TCP/IP, Unix, Mac, DEC VMS connectivity products
- Digital Research for US$80 million (1991) for PC operating system software (DR DOS etc.)
- International Business Software Ltd. (1992)
- Serius (1993)
- Unix System Laboratories (1993)
- WordPerfect Corporation (1994)
- Quattro Pro (Borland) (1994)
- Netoria (1999)
- Ukiah Software (1999)
- JustOn (1999)
- PGSoft (2000)
- Novetrix (2001)
- Cambridge Technology Partners (2001)
- Callisto Software, Inc. (2001)
- SilverStream Software (2002)
- Ximian (2003)
- SUSE (2003)
- Salmon (2004)
- Tally Systems (2005)
- Immunix (2005)
- e-Security, Inc (2006)
- RedMojo (2007)
- Senforce (2007)
- PlateSpin (2008)
- SiteScape (2008)
- Fortefi (2008) for Command Control and Compliance Auditor
- Managed Objects, Inc. (2008)

== Certification ==
Novell was one of the first computer companies to provide proficiency certification for users of its products. They included:

- Certified Novell Administrator (CNA)
- Certified Novell Engineer (CNE)
- Enterprise Certified Novell Engineer (ECNE)
- Master Certified Novell Engineer (MCNE)
- Certified Directory Engineer (CDE)
- Certified Novell Instructor (CNI)
- Master Certified Novell Instructor (MCNI)
- Certified Linux Professional 10 (CLP 10)
- Certified Linux Engineer 10 (CLE 10)

== Legacy ==
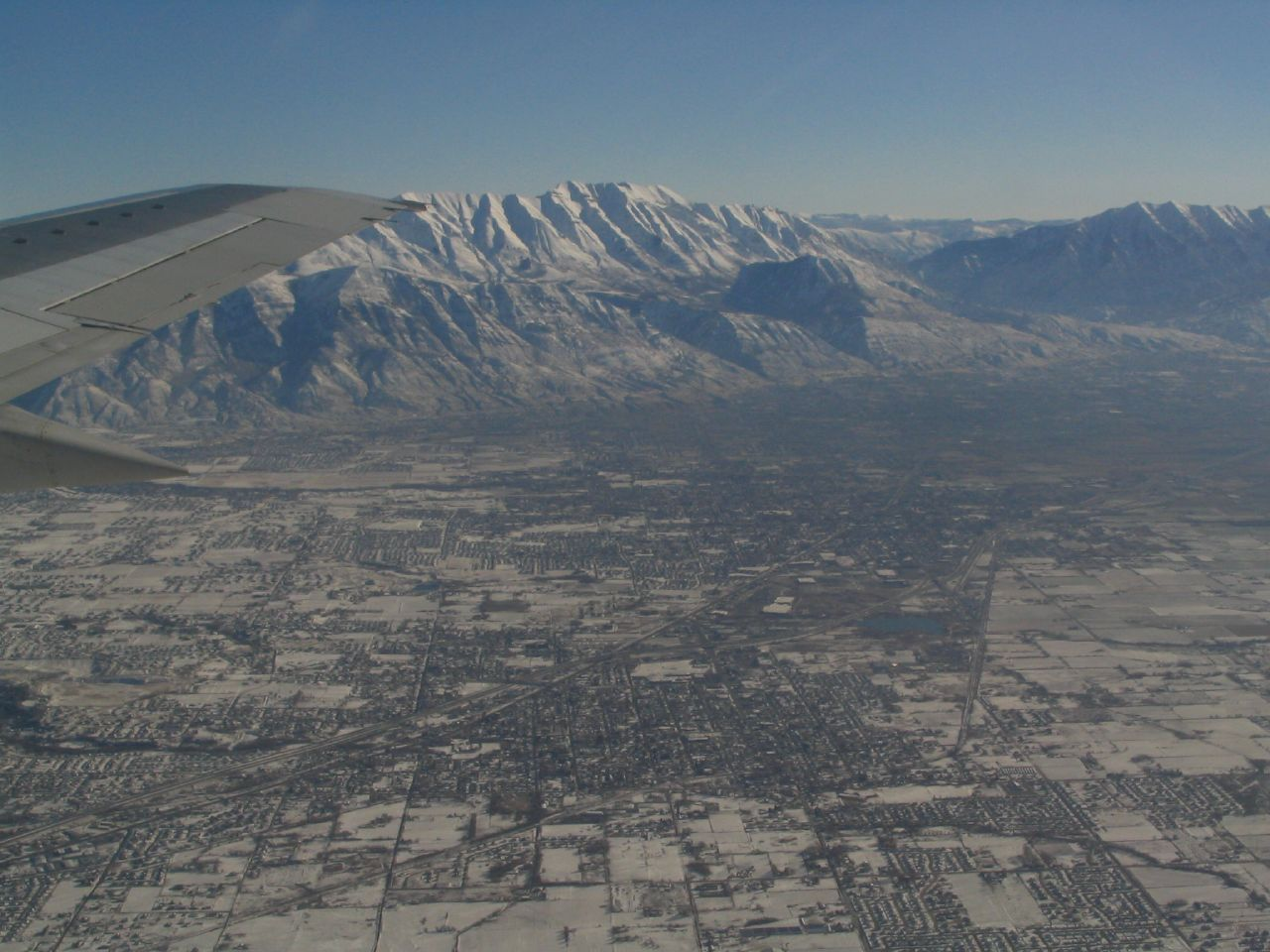
Utah Valley, home of Novell, WordPerfect, and many tech companies that followed

Novell had a difficult time being associated for anything other than NetWare. And as The Register has written, "NetWare was almost uniquely a thing of its time. Whereas the PC has transcended its roots ... and Windows has grown ... into a sophisticated 64-bit OS, NetWare never escaped as its niche. When Windows was just a client OS, Novell’s proprietary IPX/SPX protocol and simple, fast, semi-dedicated file servers were a compelling offering. As Windows grew into a server OS too, though, NetWare couldn't compete."

But the effects of Novell have been long-lasting. While information technology had been present along the Wasatch Front since the 1950s in the form of work done at Utah State University, the first two software giants in the field in Utah were Novell and WordPerfect in the early 1980s. To that point, the Deseret News has stated, "WordPerfect and Novell put Utah Valley on the high-tech industry map in the 1980s." Moreover, even when employees left the two companies, or were downsized, they often stayed in the Utah Valley area and started their own companies. This began a culture of entrepreneurship that led to the Wasatch Front becoming known by some as Silicon Slopes. Silicon Slopes Magazine has credited the rise of the industry in Utah to three people, among them Ray Noorda.

== Products ==
Products marketed by Novell during the latter stages of its existence included:

- BorderManager provides Internet access controls, secure VPN, and firewall services on NetWare
- Business Continuity Clustering automates the configuration and management of high-availability, clustered servers
- Client for Linux gives Linux desktop users access to NetWare and Open Enterprise Server services and applications
- Client for Windows gives Microsoft Windows users access to NetWare and Open Enterprise Server services and applications
- Cluster Services for Open Enterprise Server simplifies resource management on a Storage Area Network (SAN) and enables high-availability
- Data Synchronizer keeps applications and mobile devices constantly in sync, and offers connectors for popular CRM systems
- Endpoint Lifecycle Management Suite manages applications, devices, and servers over their life-cycle
- Endpoint Protection Suite Endpoint Protection Suite
- File Management Suite integrates three Novell products that work together to discover, analyze, provision, relocate and optimize file storage based on business policies
- File Reporter examines and reports on terabytes of unstructured file data, and forecasts storage growth
- GroupWise provides secure e-mail, calendaring, contact management, and task management with mobile synchronization
- iFolder stores files for secure accessibility online and offline, across systems and on the web
- iPrint, a network appliance print server supports mobility on printing, a user can print from any device from anywhere to anywhere in any corner of the world
- NFS Gateway for NetWare 6.5 enables NetWare 6.5 servers to access UNIX and Linux NFS-exported file-systems
- Open Enterprise Server offers NetWare services like centralized server management and secure file storage, running on SUSE Linux Enterprise Server
- Open Workgroup Suite provides a low-cost alternative to Microsoft Professional Desktop Platform; features workgroup services and collaboration tools
- Open Workgroup Suite for Small Business offers a full-featured desktop-to-server solution running on Linux, designed to support small business users
- Service Desk streamlines and automates the provision of IT services. An OEM product from LiveTime Software.
- Storage Manager provides automated management of file storage for users and work groups
- Total Endpoint Management Suite efficiently balances security and productivity across an entire enterprise
- Vibe provides secure team collaboration with document management and workflow features that can replace existing intranet systems
- ZENworks, a software suite supporting the management of computer systems
  - ZENworks Application Virtualization allows the packaging and deployment of virtualized applications with predictive application-streaming that delivers apps based on user behavior
  - ZENworks Asset Management provides reports on hardware and software, integrating licensing, installation, and usage data
  - ZENworks Configuration Management provides automated endpoint-management, software distribution, user support, and accelerated Windows 7 migration
  - ZENworks Endpoint Security Management (ZES) - provides identity-based protection for client endpoints like laptops, smart phones, and thumb drives; offers driver-level firewall protection
  - ZENworks Full Disk Encryption protects data on laptops and desktops
  - ZENworks Handheld Management allows securing stolen handhelds, protects user data, enforces password policies, and locks out lost or stolen devices
  - ZENworks Linux Management facilitates the control of Linux desktops and servers, using policy-driven automation to deploy, manage and maintain Linux resources
  - ZENworks Mobile Management secures and manages mobile devices, both corporate-issued and personal (BYOD)
  - ZENworks Patch Management automates patch assessment, monitoring and remediation; monitors patch compliance to detect security vulnerabilities
  - ZENworks Virtual Appliance provides self-contained plug-and-play configuration management, asset management and patch management

== See also ==
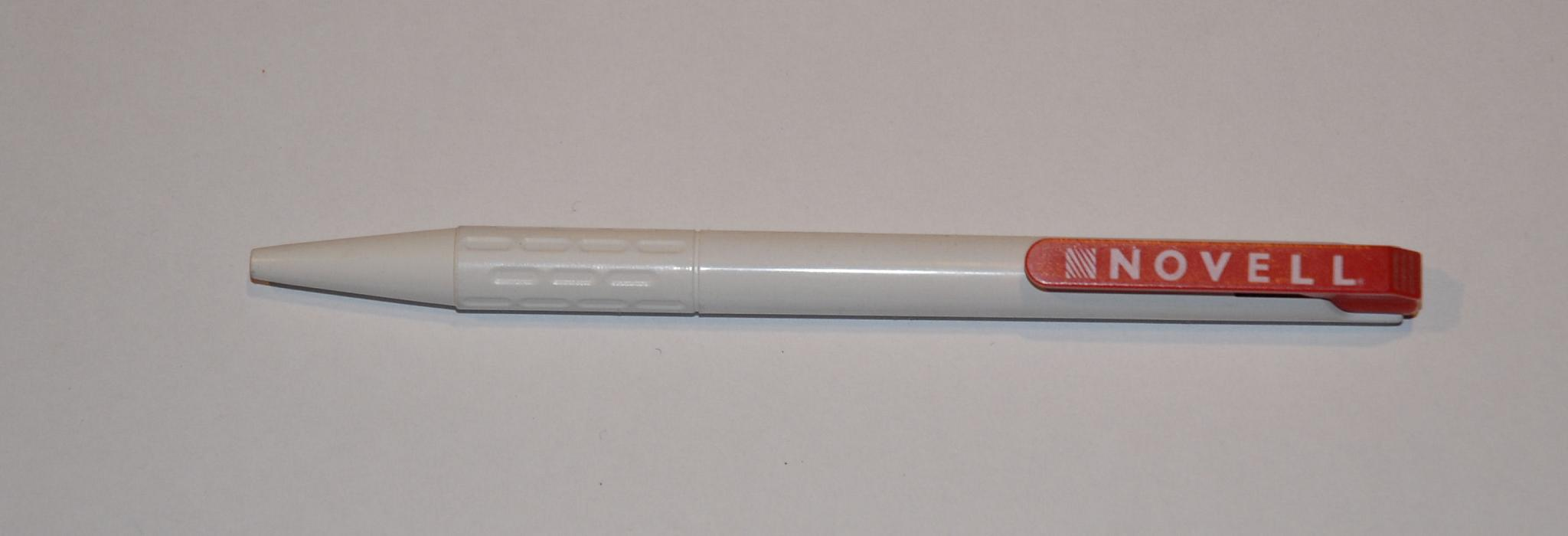
A Novell-branded ballpoint pen

- Novell BrainShare
