= Excelan =

1982-89 American computer networking company

Excelan Inc
- Company type: Public
- Industry: Computer networks
- Founded: 1982
- Founder: Kanwal Rekhi; Inder Singh; Navindra Jain
- Defunct: 1989
- Fate: Acquired
- Successor: Novell
- Headquarters: San Jose, California, US
- Key people: Kanwal Rekhi (CEO)
- Products: Network hardware
- Revenue: US$65,860,000 (1988)
- Net income: US$5,459,000 (1988)

Excelan was a computer networking company founded in 1982 by Kanwal Rekhi, Inder Singh, and Navindra Jain. Excelan was a manufacturer of smart Ethernet cards, until the company was acquired by Novell in 1989. The company offered a line of Ethernet "front end processor" boards for Multibus, VMEbus, Q-Bus, Unibus, and IBM AT Bus systems. The cards were equipped with their own processor and memory, and ran TCP/IP protocol software that was downloaded onto the cards from the host system. Excelan offered software like LAN Workplace that integrated the cards into a variety of operating system environments, including many flavors of UNIX, RSX-11, VMS, and MS-DOS. The hardware and software were sold under the EXOS brand. In 1987, Excelan also acquired Kinetics, a small networking company that manufactured and sold a variety of Ethernet networking products for Apple Macintosh environments, most notably an AppleTalk-to-Ethernet gateway called the FastPath.

Excelan also manufactured and sold Ethernet network analyzer products, the first being the Excelan Nutcracker, followed later by the Excelan LANalyzer.

== See also ==
- Novell LAN WorkPlace for DOS
