= Ray Noorda =

American businessman

Raymond John Noorda
- Born: 19 June 1924; Ogden, Utah
- Died: 9 October 2006 (aged 82); Orem, Utah
- Education: B.S. in engineering
- Alma mater: Weber State College; University of Utah
- Known for: Novell CEO and Chairman

Raymond John "Ray" Noorda (19 June 1924 – 9 October 2006) was an American computer businessman. He was CEO of Novell between 1982 and 1994. He also served as chairman of Novell until he was replaced in 1994.

== Early life ==
Noorda was born in Ogden, Utah, the third son of Dutch immigrants Bertus Noorda and Alida Margaretha van den Berg. He attended Weber State College in Ogden. During World War II, he served in the U.S. Navy for two years as an electronics technician, working with radar systems. He graduated cum laude with a bachelor's degree in engineering from the University of Utah in 1949. Noorda worked for General Electric from graduation until 1971, after which he worked at a number of California companies.

== Personal life ==
Noorda was a member of the Church of Jesus Christ of Latter-day Saints (LDS Church). He married Lewena "Tye" Taylor in 1950, and they were later sealed in the Salt Lake Temple. Among the positions that Noorda held in the LDS Church were counselor in a branch presidency and counselor in a stake Sunday school presidency.

== Novell ==
In 1983, Noorda assembled the SuperSet team whose members included Drew Major, James Bills, Dale Niebaur and Kyle Powell. The team was originally assigned to create a CP/M disk sharing system, but instead came up with a successful file sharing system for the newly introduced IBM-compatible PC. This network operating system was later called Novell NetWare.

Under Noorda's watch, Novell acquired several companies and products with the goal of countering Microsoft's rapid spread into new markets, including Digital Research, Unix System Laboratories, WordPerfect, and Borland's Quattro Pro. Microsoft CEO Bill Gates claimed that Noorda had a "tremendous vendetta" against Microsoft and that Noorda had supported the Federal Trade Commission's antitrust investigations of Microsoft in the early 1990s that led to a consent decree restricting its operating system licensing practices.

Noorda ran Novell until 1993. He was succeeded by Robert Frankenberg in 1994.

Around 1992, Noorda used the term co-opetition to characterize Novell's business strategy.

== Later career ==
Up to his death, Noorda owned the Canopy Group, which he had founded in 1992 through the Noorda Family Trust (NFT Ventures, Inc.). One of its holdings, Caldera, purchased the Unix assets in 2000 from the Santa Cruz Operation, which had acquired them from Novell in 1995. In 1996, it also acquired the Digital Research assets from Novell and immediately brought a lawsuit against Microsoft that largely duplicated the claims that the Federal Trade Commission (FTC) and Department of Justice had pursued in the early 1990s. The lawsuit was ultimately settled in 2000 with a $280 million payment to Caldera.

Noorda received honorary doctorates from the University of Utah in 1994 and Weber State University in 1995. As a consequence of age and associated health issues (Alzheimer's disease and heart disease), Noorda did not participate in the day-to-day management of Canopy's affairs after 1998.

Noorda was inducted into the Junior Achievement U.S. Business Hall of Fame in 1995.

Noorda had four sons and one daughter. His daughter committed suicide in 2005. Noorda died on 9 October 2006 at his home in Orem, Utah, at the age of 82.
