= Interaction protocol =

Within the fields of computer science and robotics, interaction protocols are possible communication scenarios between individual agents in multi-agent systems. Some protocols are described quite qualitatively (for example, many parts of the traffic code), but others have a formal model, whose implementations can be tested for conformance (for example, some cryptographic protocols).

FIPA defines markup for interaction protocol diagrams and several standard interaction protocols, including Dutch auction, English auction and reply-response.

== See also ==
- Multi-agent planning
