= Venture (magazine) =

- Categories: Business magazine
- Frequency: Monthly
- Founder: Joseph D. Giarraputo
- Founded: 1979
- Company: Nathaniel Press
- Country: US
- Language: English
- Website: Venture
- ISSN: 0191-3530

Venture magazine is a business management magazine. It focuses on business best practices. It is used by business leaders to learn from their colleagues' successes and challenges.

== History and profile ==
Venture was founded in 1979 by Joseph D. Giarraputo. In 1981 the magazine was acquired by Arthur Lipper and became part VenPub Inc., which was based in Manhattan. It was subtitle For Entrepreneural Business Owners and Investors. Arthur Lipper sold it to Family Media in 1988. The Washington Post reported that its 1988 circulation was 450,000.

In 2011 the parent company of Schofield Media Chicago, Schofield Media Group LLC, ceased operations. Magazine is part of Nathaniel Press and is published with the name Chicago Venture Magazine.
