= Browser service =

Browser service or Computer Browser Service is a feature of Microsoft Windows to let users easily browse and locate shared resources in neighboring computers. This is done by aggregating the information in a single computer browse master (or master browser). All other computers contact this computer for information and display in the Network Neighborhood window.

Browser service runs on mailslot and Server Message Block and thus can be used with all supported transport protocol such as NBF ("NetBEUI"), NBX (IPX/SPX) and NBT (TCP/IP). Browser service relies heavily on broadcast, so it is not available across network segments separated by routers. Browsing across different IP subnets need the help of Domain Master Browser, which is always the Primary Domain Controller (PDC). Therefore, browsing across IP subnets is not possible in a pure workgroup network.

== In Windows XP ==
In Windows XP, Computer Browser Service provides backwards compatibility for versions that don't use Active Directory. For My Network Places, Windows Explorer, and the net view command, Computer Browser is still needed in XP.

== Windows NT ==
Windows NT uses the Computer Browser service to collect and display all computers and other resources on the network. For example, opening Network Neighborhood displays the list of computers, shared folders, and printers; the Computer Browser service manages this list. Every time Windows NT boots up, this service also starts.

Computer Browser is responsible for two closely related services: building a list of available network resources, and sharing this list with other computers. All Windows NT computers run the Computer Browser service, but not all of them are responsible for building the list.

Most computers will only retrieve the list from the computers that actually collect the data and build it. Windows NT computers can therefore have different roles:

- Domain master browser: In NT domains, the primary domain controllers (PDCs) handle this role. The PDCs maintain a list of all available network servers located on all subnets in the domain. They get the list for each subnet from the master browser for that subnet. On networks that have only one subnet, the PDC handles both the domain master browser and the master browser roles.
- Master browsers: Computers maintaining this role build the browse list for servers on their own subnet and forward the list to the domain master browser and the backup browsers on its own subnet. There is one master browser per subnet.
- Backup browsers: These computers distribute the list of available servers from master browsers and send them to individual computers requesting the information. For example, when you open Network Neighborhood, your computer contacts the backup browser and requests the list of all available servers.
- Potential browsers: Some computers don't currently maintain the browse list, but they're capable of doing so if necessary, which designates them as potential browsers. If one of the existing browsers fails, potential browsers can take over.
- Nonbrowsers: These are computers that aren't capable of maintaining and distributing a browse list.
