= List of Unix daemons =

This is a list of daemons that are commonly found on a Unix-like operating system. A common convention is to name a daemon with a d suffix.

Name	Description
init	The program which spawns all other processes. As of 2016, for major Linux distributions, it has been replaced by systemd.
biod	Works in cooperation with the remote nfsd to handle client NFS requests.
crond	Time-based job scheduler, runs jobs in the background.
dhcpd	Dynamically configure TCP/IP information for clients.
fingerd	Provides a network interface for the finger protocol, as used by the finger command.
ftpd	Services FTP requests from a remote system.
httpd	Web server daemon.
inetd	Listens for network connection requests. If a request is accepted, it can launch a background daemon to handle the request, was known as the super server for this reason. Some systems use the replacement command xinetd.
lpd	The line printer daemon that manages printer spooling.
nfsd	Processes NFS operation requests from client systems. Historically each nfsd daemon handled one request at a time, so it was normal to start multiple copies.
ntpd	Network Time Protocol daemon that manages clock synchronization across the network. xntpd implements the version 3 standard of NTP.
portmap/rpcbind	Provides information to allow ONC RPC clients to contact ONC RPC servers
sshd	Listens for Secure Shell requests from clients.
sendmail	SMTP daemon.
swapper	Copies process regions to swap space in order to reclaim physical pages of memory for the kernel. Also called sched.
syslogd	System logger process that collects various system messages.
syncd	Periodically keeps the file systems synchronized with system memory.
systemd	Replacement of init, the Unix program which spawns all other processes.
xfsd	Serve X11 fonts to remote clients.
vhand	Releases pages of memory for use by other processes. Also known as the "page stealing daemon"
ypbind	Find the server for an NIS domain and store the information in a file.

== See also ==
- List of POSIX commands
