= LMHOSTS =

File is used to enable Domain Name Resolution under Windows

The LMHOSTS (LAN Manager Hosts) file is used to enable Domain Name Resolution under Windows when other methods, such as WINS, fail. It is used in conjunction with workgroups and domains. If you are looking for a simple, general mechanism for the local specification of IP addresses for specific hostnames (server names), use the HOSTS file, not the LMHOSTS file.

The file, if it exists, is read as the LMHOSTS setting file. A sample file (lmhosts.sam) is provided. It contains documentation for manually configuring the file.

== File locations ==
Windows 95, 98, Millennium Edition

The file is located in %windir%, and a sample file (lmhosts.sam) is installed here. Note that %windir% is an environment variable pointing to the Windows installation directory, usually C:\Windows.

Windows NT 4.0, Windows 2000, Windows XP, Vista, 7, 8, 10, Windows Server 2003, Windows Server 2008, Windows Server 2008 R2, Windows Server 2012, Windows Server 2016+

The file is located in %windir%\system32\drivers\etc\, and a sample file (lmhosts.sam) is installed here. Note that %windir% is an environment variable pointing to the Windows installation directory, usually C:\Windows.

== See also ==
- HOSTS file
- NetBIOS
