= Sharity =

Network file access software

In computing, Sharity is a program to allow a Unix system to mount SMB fileshares. It is developed by Christian Starkjohann of Objective Development Software GmbH and is proprietary software. As of 8 November 2010, the current version is 3.9.

Linux (using smbfs or cifsfs), and FreeBSD, NetBSD, and macOS (using smbfs), can mount SMB natively. Most other Unix and Unix-like operating systems cannot. In the proprietary Unix world, Sharity is a common solution to mounting SMB shares, as the usual recommended workaround — to run Services for UNIX on the Windows file server and make the share available via NFS — is frequently unreliable in practice.

Sharity works by making an external SMB share appear to the kernel as an NFS-mounted file system. (Compare to smbclient from Samba, which either provides an FTP-like interactive shell or sends commands to the Windows file server to be executed remotely.)

The program runs on the following Unix and Unix-like operating systems: macOS, IRIX, Solaris, HP-UX, FreeBSD, NetBSD, OpenBSD, BSD/OS, Tru64, AIX, NEXTSTEP, OpenStep, UnixWare, SunOS 4, and Linux.

Sharity is a rewrite of an earlier program, Sharity-Light, which is free software under the GPL (having been derived from smbfs in Linux) but is limited in capabilities and is no longer developed. Sharity-Light was originally called Rumba (a pun on "Samba"), but the name was trademarked to another company. Sharity-Light runs in user space rather than kernel space.
