= List of products that support SMB =

List of products that support the proprietary Server Message Block (SMB) protocol by IBM and later Microsoft.

== Implementations ==
The list below explicitly refers to "SMB" as including an SMB client or an SMB server, plus the various protocols that extend SMB, such as the Network Neighborhood suite of protocols and the NT Domains suite.

- Microsoft Windows includes an SMB client and server in all members of the Windows NT family and in Windows 95, Windows 98, and Windows Me.
- The Linux kernel includes two SMB client implementations that use the Linux VFS, providing access to files on an SMB server through the standard file system API: smbfs and cifs. Also it is possible to mount the whole hierarchy of workgroups/servers/shares ("neighborhood") through FUSE kernel module and its userspace counterpart fusesmb. CIFSD, which is an In-kernel CIFS/SMB server implementation for Linux kernel, is available. It has the following advantages over user-space implementations: 1. It provides better performance, 2. It's easier to implement some features like SMB Direct.
- Plan 9 from Bell Labs contained both a CIFS/SMB server aquarela and client cifs.
- FreeBSD includes an SMB client implementation called smbfs that uses its VFS.
- NetBSD and macOS include SMB client implementations called smbfs, originally derived from the FreeBSD smbfs; they use the NetBSD and macOS VFSes, respectively.
- macOS, starting with Mac OS X Lion, has an Apple-developed SMB server implementation called SMBX.
- Solaris has a project called CIFS client for Solaris, based on the Mac OS X smbfs.
- OpenSolaris added in-kernel CIFS server support in October 2007. This is also present in OpenIndiana and NexentaStor.
- Sun Microsystems Cascade, which became known as PC-Netlink, represents a port of Advanced Server for Unix. Sun took over two years making the code useful, due to the poor quality of the original port.
- Novell NetWare version 6 and newer has a CIFS server implementation providing access to NetWare volumes for Microsoft Network clients.
- Novell Open Enterprise Server includes a SMB/CIFS server implementation to provide access to NSS volumes for different client platforms (Windows, Mac, and Linux).
- YNQ - an SMB Server and Client library written in ANSI C that runs on non-Windows systems, including embedded and IoT systems with memory and CPU constraints, to enable connectivity with Windows, Mac and Linux machines.
- Samba, which re-implements the SMB protocol and the Microsoft extensions to it as free software, includes an SMB server and a command-line SMB client. Version 3.0 or later is required for NTLMv2 authentication support, while versions 3.6+ or 4.0+ are required for SMB2 interoperability.
- FreeNAS, a dedicated small-sized NAS server, runs FreeBSD for Network-attached storage (NAS) services, and supports protocols including CIFS/SMB.
- Advanced Server for Unix (AS/U) comprises a port of Windows NT 3.51's SMB server code to Unix. Microsoft licensed the code to AT&T, which then licensed it to major Unix vendors.
- VERITAS Software has an implementation of SMB.
- Santa Cruz Operation (SCO) had a port of Advanced Server for Unix.
- SCO also had VisionFS, a re-implementation of SMB intended to distribute SCO components and have easier configuration than Samba.
- Samba TNG: a fork of Samba.
- agorum core, open source enterprise content management system with fully integrated CIFS-Server for accessing documents.
- EMC Corporation has an SMB server with its Celerra platforms.
- NetApp has an SMB server implementation.
- Isilon Systems OneFS File System has a clustered NAS SMB server implementation which was originally developed by Likewise Software. Previous versions of Isilon System's was based on Samba. Subsequent versions of OneFS integrated Likewise Software's implementation of an SMB Server.
  - Likewise Software has offered Likewise-CIFS, an open source SMB/CIFS file server with support for both SMB1 and SMB2.
- Objective Development's Sharity provides an SMB file-system client for Unix.
- Tuxera develops and sells a proprietary SMB server and client implementation for Linux that supports all SMB protocols.
- The Alfresco content-management system includes JLAN, a Java implementation of an SMB server.
- The LogicalDOC document management system includes a client for connecting to SMB, implemented in Java
- Thursby Software Systems developed DAVE, the first commercial implementation of SMB/CIFS for Classic Mac OS in 1996, co-writing the Mac standards with Microsoft in 2002. It was later ported to Mac OS X. Thursby's DAVE, ADmitMac and ADmitMac PKI products include both an SMB client and an SMB server, and support Microsoft's DFS.
- An iPhone application named Flash Files has an SMB server implementation.
- Some Sony-Ericsson mobile phones have an SMB server built in.
- The Huawei Y9 Prime smartphone (2019) has a built-in CIFS server called Huawei Share.
- Microsoft Azure. Cloud file server supporting SMB3 (and SMB2.1).
- BT Smart Hub routers use SMB1 for NAS functionality.
- Bloombase has a CIFS/SMB implementation for transparent data-at-rest encryption use cases.
- Ryussi provides MoSMB server, a cloud scale active-active scale-out clustered SMB implementation for Linux supporting POSIX file systems like ZFS, Luster, Ceph, etc in addition to S3 object storage as the storage backend.
