= Domain master browser =

The domain master browser is a discontinued Windows networking role responsible for broadcasting and synchronizing browse lists across multiple subnets within a single Windows domain. It is necessary on a routed TCP/IP network, that is, when a Windows domain spans more than one TCP/IP network. When a Windows domain spans multiple subnets, each of the subnets has an independent browser called the master browser. The master browser is responsible for the browse list within its respective subnet and portion of the domain on its subnet. The domain master browser is used to collect information from each of the master browsers via the NetServerEnum API call. Once collected the list is merged with the domain master browsers list for its own subnet. This merged list forms the enterprise wide browse list for the domain. This merged list is then distributed to the master browsers in each subnet so that the enterprise list can be available to computers requesting services.

As part of the Windows Server operating system, the browser service is used to host information of other Windows computers within the same Windows domain or TCP/IP network. The domain master browser coordinates browse lists from all the local browsers in a workgroup, no matter what their network segments. Browsing in these terms is specific to viewing network resources within the Windows network such as the available computers, resources, and domains. The information, called a browse list, is held by the browser and primarily consists of the computer names and the services each of the computers offers. There are several browser roles: the backup, the master browser, and the domain master browser.

The domain master browser is located on the domain primary domain controller, or PDC.
