= Tittel =

Tittel is a surname. Notable people with the surname include:

- Dušan Tittel (born 1966), Slovak footballer and manager
- Ed Tittel (born 1952), American writer
- Ellen Tittel (born 1953), German Olympic runner
- Frank Tittel (1933 — 2026), German-born laser physicist
- Kevin Tittel (born 1994), German footballer

== See also ==
- Kittel (surname)
