= Pathworks =

PATHWORKS was the trade name used by Digital Equipment Corporation of Maynard, Massachusetts for a series of programs that eased the interoperation of Digital's minicomputers and servers with personal computers. It was available for both PC and Mac systems, with support for MS-DOS, OS/2 and Microsoft Windows on the PC. Before it was named PATHWORKS, it was known as PCSA (Personal Computing Systems Architecture).

PATHWORKS server ran on OpenVMS and Ultrix (and later Digital UNIX) and enabled a system or cluster to act as a file and print server for client IBM PC compatible and Macintosh workstations. A version of PATHWORKS server for OS/2 was also available, allowing a PC with OS/2 to act as a server to other PCs. PATHWORKS server was derived from LanMan/X, the portable version of OS/2 LAN Manager.

In 1992 DEC said that PATHWORKS revenue would soon be larger than for VMS. PATHWORKS was one of DEC's most successful products ever. Analysis of sales showed that on average, each PATHWORKS license brought in at least $3,000 USD in server revenue (server HW, SW, storage, printers, networking, and services), so it was a major driver for DEC's revenue in the mid and late 1980s.

Later versions of PATHWORKS were known as Advanced Server for OpenVMS (or Advanced Server for Unix for Tru64). Advanced Server was replaced on OpenVMS by Samba at the time of the porting of VMS to Itanium. This was due to the amount of effort required to keep Advanced Server compatible with new versions of Windows and the Server Message Block (SMB) protocol.

== Features ==
Once installed onto the PCs, the PATHWORKS client provided the following features:

- DECnet, and later TCP/IP and NetBEUI, end-node connectivity with the host and client systems
- PowerTerm 525 Terminal emulation software from Ericom
- eXcursion, an X11 server for Windows.
- File-transfer software. This was a DECnet-DOS file transfer utility, although it was somewhat superfluous because the PATHWORKS server software presented VMS or UNIX files to the PC clients as if they were PC files being served by a Windows server.

The PATHWORKS server software provided access to server file storage and print services using the native Microsoft protocols. Later versions of PATHWORKS servers on VMS supported NetWare and Macintosh clients, but they never achieved the volumes of the Microsoft clients. For clients running a GUI such as Windows 3.x, additional components available included an X window system server, allowing clients to access graphical apps running on VMS or UNIX hosts, and clients for DEC's ALL-IN-1 email and groupware system. Although primitive by modern standards, PATHWORKS was very sophisticated for its time; far more than just a file and print server, it made client microcomputers into terminals and workstations on a DEC network.

== Implementation ==
LanMan normally ran across Microsoft's basic, non-routable NetBIOS/NetBEUI NBF protocol, but PATHWORKS included a DECnet stack, including layers like the LAT transport used for terminal sessions. The complexity of DECnet by 1980s PC standards meant that the PATHWORKS client was a huge software stack to have resident in MS-DOS; configuring the PATHWORKS client was a complex task, made more so by the need to preserve enough conventional memory for DOS applications to run. To keep a reasonable amount of base memory free mandated the use of QEMM or a similar memory manager. This problem went away once 386-based PCs became prevalent and MS Windows provided built-in support for large amounts of memory.
