= Flexible single master operation =

Feature of Microsoft's Active Directory

Flexible single master operation (FSMO, F is sometimes "floating"; pronounced Fiz-mo), or just single master operation or operations master, is a feature of Microsoft's Active Directory (AD). In around 2002, the term FSMO was deprecated in favour of operations masters.

FSMO is a specialized domain controller (DC) set of tasks, used where standard data transfer and update methods are inadequate. AD normally relies on multiple peer DCs, each with a copy of the AD database, being synchronized by multi-master replication. The tasks which are not suited to multi-master replication and are viable only with a single-master database are the FSMOs.

== FSMO roles ==
=== Per-domain roles ===
These roles are applicable at the domain level (i.e., there is one of each for every domain in a forest):

- The PDC Emulator – This role is the most used of all FSMO roles and has the widest range of functions. The domain controller that holds the PDC Emulator role (where PDC stands for Primary Domain Controller) is crucial in a mixed environment where Windows NT 4.0 BDCs are still present. This is because the PDC Emulator role emulates the functions of a Windows NT 4.0 PDC. Even if all Windows NT 4.0 domain controllers have been migrated to Windows 2000 or later, the domain controller that holds the PDC Emulator role still does a lot. The PDC Emulator is the domain source for time synchronization for all other domain controllers; in a multi-domain forest, the PDC Emulator in each domain synchronizes to the forest root PDC Emulator. All other domain member computers synchronize to their respective domain controllers. It is critically important that computer clocks are synchronized across the forest because excessive clock skew causes Kerberos authentication to fail. In addition, all password changes occur on the PDC Emulator and receive priority replication.
- The RID Master – This FSMO role owner is the single DC responsible for processing RID (Relative ID) Pool requests from all DCs within a given domain. It is also responsible for moving an object from one domain to another during an interdomain object move. When a DC creates a security principal object such as a user or group, it attaches a unique SID to the object. This SID consists of a domain SID (the same for all SIDs created in a domain) and a relative ID (RID) that is unique for each security principal SID created in a domain. Each DC in a domain is allocated a pool of RIDs that it is allowed to assign to the security principals it creates. When a DC's allocated RID pool falls below a threshold, that DC issues a request for additional RIDs to the domain's RID Master FSMO role owner, the RID Master FSMO role owner responds to the request by retrieving RIDs from the domain's unallocated RID pool and assigns them to the pool of the requesting DC.
- The Infrastructure Master – The purpose of this role is to ensure that cross-domain object references are correctly handled. For example, if a user from one domain is added to a security group from a different domain, the Infrastructure Master makes sure this is done properly. However, if the Active Directory deployment has only a single domain, then the Infrastructure Master role does no work at all, and even in a multi-domain environment it is rarely used except when complex user administration tasks are performed. This applies to the domain partition (default naming context) only. netdom query fsmo and ntdsutil will only query the domain partition. However, every application partition, including Forest and Domain-level DNS domain zones has its own Infrastructure Master. The holder of this role is stored in the fSMORoleOwner attribute of the Infrastructure object in the root of the partition, it can be modified with ADSIEdit, for example one can modify the fSMORoleOwner attribute of the CN=Infrastructure,DC=DomainDnsZones,DC=yourdomain,DC=tld object to CN=NTDSSettings,CN=Name_of_DC,CN=Servers,CN=DRSite,CN=Sites,CN=Configuration,DC=Yourdomain,DC=TLD.

=== Per-forest roles ===
These roles are unique at the forest level (both are located in the forest root domain):

- The Schema Master – The purpose of this role is to replicate schema changes to all other domain controllers in the forest. Since the schema of Active Directory is rarely changed, however, the Schema Master role will rarely do any work. This role is typically involved in the deployment of Exchange Server and Skype for Business Server, as well as domain controllers from one version to another version, as all of these situations involve making changes to the Active Directory schema.
- The Domain Naming Master – The other forest-specific FSMO role is the Domain Naming Master, and this role also resides in the forest root domain. The Domain Naming Master role processes all changes to the namespace, for example adding the child domain vancouver.mycompany.com to the forest root domain mycompany.com requires that this role be available. Failure of this role to function correctly can prevent the addition of a new child domain or new domain tree.

== Moving FSMO roles between domain controllers ==
By default AD assigns all operations master roles to the first DC created in a forest. To provide fault tolerance, there should be multiple domain controllers available within each domain of the Forest. If new domains are created in the forest, the first DC in a new domain holds all of the domain-wide FSMO roles. This is not a satisfactory position if the domain has a large number of domain controllers. Microsoft recommends the careful division of FSMO roles, with standby DCs ready to take over each role. The PDC emulator and the RID master should be on the same DC, if possible. The Schema Master and Domain Naming Master should also be on the same DC.

When a FSMO role is transferred to a different DC, the original FSMO holder and the new FSMO holder communicate to ensure no data is lost during the transfer. If the original FSMO holder experienced an unrecoverable failure, another DC can be made to "seize" the lost roles; however, there is a risk of data loss because of the lack of communications. Seizing roles from a domain controller instead of transferring it prevents that domain controller from hosting that FSMO role again, except for the PDC Emulator and Infrastructure Master Operation roles. Corruption can occur within Active Directory. FSMO roles can be easily moved between DCs using the AD snap-ins to the MMC or using ntdsutil, which is a command line-based tool.

== FSMO Roles and Global Catalog ==
Certain FSMO roles depend on the DC being a Global Catalog (GC) server as well. When a Forest is initially created, the first Domain Controller is a Global Catalog server by default. The Global Catalog provides several functions. The GC stores object data information, manages queries of these data objects and their attributes as well as provides data to allow network logon.

Often all domain controllers are also global catalog servers. If this is not the case, the Infrastructure Master role must not be housed on a domain controller which also houses a copy of the global catalog in a multi-domain forest, as the combination of these two roles on the same host will cause unexpected (and potentially damaging) behaviour in a multi-domain environment. However, The Domain Naming Master role should be housed on a DC which is also a GC.

== Works cited ==
- Bruzzese, Peter; David Watts; J. Peter Bruzzese; Will Willis (2003). Windows 2000 Active Directory Services Infrastructure. Que. ISBN 0789728710 – via Google Books.
- Cox, Philip; Thomas Sheldon (2001). Windows 2000 Security Handbook. Osborne/McGraw-Hill. ISBN 9780072124330 – via Google Books.
- Kouti, Sakari; Mika Seitsonen (2002). Inside Active Directory: A System Administrator's Guide. Addison-Wesley. ISBN 9780201616217 – via Google Books.
- Simmons, Curt (2000). Active Directory Bible. Wiley. p. 101. ISBN 9780764547621 – via Google Books.
- Tittel, Ed; James Michael Stewart (2011). Windows Server 2003 For Dummies. Wiley. ISBN 111805301X – via Google Books.
- Wilkins, Mark (2001). Administering Active Directory. McGraw-Hill. ISBN 0072127228 – via the Internet Archive.
