= WebNFS =

Network filesystem protocol

YANFS (Yet Another NFS), formerly WebNFS, is an extension to the Network File System (NFS) for allowing clients to access a file system over the internet using a simplified, firewall-friendly protocol.

WebNFS was developed to give Java applets and other internet enabled applications a way of accessing filesystem services over the internet. While NFS provides applications on Unix with full filesystem semantics, not all of these might be needed in a distributed, read-only web environment. Conversely, access restrictions—such as requiring the use of restricted ports for originating requests—normally used in closed environments are not usually applicable in public distributed environments.

In 2007, Sun Microsystems open-sourced its WebNFS implementation. The name was subsequently changed to YANFS (Yet Another NFS) to reflect the expanded scope of the project to include a server-side implementation.

YANFS/WebNFS makes use of a well known port (port 2049 on both UDP and TCP) thus avoiding the overhead and unpredictability of using the ONC RPC portmap protocol. WebNFS adds public filehandles and multicomponent lookups to the NFS protocol.

WebNFS has been specified by a number of RFCs:

- RFC 2054: WebNFS Client
- RFC 2055: WebNFS Server
- RFC 2224: NFS URL Scheme
- RFC 2755: Security negotiation for WebNFS

== Legacy ==
While WebNFS itself did not gain much traction, several important WebNFS features later became part of NFSv4, including use of port 2049, and the concept of a fixed "root filehandle" (which evolved from WebNFS public filehandles and allows exported filesystems to be accessed without needing the MOUNT protocol to learn their individual root handles first); both together allow NFSv4 to function without the Portmap service.
