= RPCGEN =

Interface generator pre-compiler for Sun Microsystems ONC RPC

RPCGEN is an interface generator pre-compiler for Sun Microsystems ONC RPC. It uses an interface definition file to create client and server stubs in C.

== RPC language ==
RPCGEN creates stubs based on information contained within an IDL file. This file is written in a language called RPCL - remote procedure call language. This language closely mimics C in style, and is designed purely for defining specification to be used for ONC RPC.

An RPC specification contains a number of definitions. These definitions are used by RPCGEN to create a header file for use by both the client and server, and client and server stubs.

=== RPCL definitions ===
- Constant
- Enumeration
- Struct
- Union (Note that this is not like a C union — it behaves more like a discriminated record)
- Typedef
- Program
