= CacheFS =

File system technology

CacheFS is a family of software technologies designed to speed up distributed file system file access for networked computers. They store copies (caches) of files on secondary memory, typically a local hard disk, so that if a file is accessed again, it can be fetched locally at much higher speeds than networks typically allow.

CacheFS software is used on several Unix-like operating systems. The original Unix version was developed by Sun Microsystems in 1993. Another version was written for Linux and released in 2003.

Network filesystems are dependent on a network link and a remote server; obtaining a file from such a filesystem can be significantly slower than getting the file locally. For this reason, it can be desirable to cache data from these filesystems on a local disk, thus potentially speeding up future accesses to that data by avoiding the need to go to the network and fetch it again. The software has to check that the remote file has not changed since it was cached, but this is much faster than reading the whole file again.

== Prior art ==
Sprite used large disk block caches. These were located in main-memory to achieve high performance in its file system. The term CacheFS has found little or no use to describe caches in main memory.

== Grossmont version ==
The first CacheFS implementation, in 6502 assembler, was a write through cache developed by Mathew R Mathews at Grossmont College. It was used from fall 1986 to spring 1990 on three diskless 64 kB main memory Apple IIe computers to cache files from a Nestar file server onto Big Board, a 1 MB DRAM secondary memory device partitioned into CacheFS and TmpFS. The computers ran Pineapple DOS, an Apple DOS 3.3 derivative developed in the course of a follow on to WR Bornhorst's NSF funded Instructional Computing System. Pineapple DOS features, including caching, were unnamed; the name CacheFS was introduced seven years later by Sun Microsystems.

== Sun version ==
The first Unix CacheFS implementation was developed by Sun Microsystems and released in the Solaris 2.3 operating system release in 1993, as part of an expanded feature set for the NFS or Network File System suite known as Open Network Computing Plus (ONC+). It was subsequently used in other UNIX operating systems such as IRIX (starting with the 5.3 release in 1994).

== Linux version ==
Linux operating systems now commonly use a new version of CacheFS developed by David Howells. Howells appears to have rewritten CacheFS from scratch, not using Sun's original code.

The Linux CacheFS currently is designed to operate on Andrew File System and Network File System (NFS) filesystems.

=== Terminology ===
Because of its similar naming to FS-Cache, CacheFS' terminology is confusing to outsiders. CacheFS is a backend for FS-Cache and handles the actual data storage and retrieval. FS-Cache passes the requests from netfs to CacheFS.

=== FS-Cache ===
The cache facility/layer between the cache backends just like CacheFS and NFS or AFS.

=== Cache backends ===
==== CacheFS ====
CacheFS is a Filesystem for the FS-Cache facility. A block device can be used as cache by simply mounting it. Needs no special activation and is deactivated by unmounting it.

==== Cachefiles (daemon) ====
Daemon using an existing filesystem (ext3 with user_xattr) as cache. Cache is bound with "cachefilesd -s".

=== Project status ===
As of 2010, work on the project appeared to have stalled, and some people were attempting to revive the code and bring it up to date.

=== Features ===
The facility can be conceptualized by the following diagram:

The facility (known as FS-Cache) is designed to be as transparent as possible to a user of the system. Applications should just be able to use NFS files as normal, without any knowledge of there being a cache.

== See also ==
- Page cache
