= SSLBridge =

Web interface for Samba

- Developer(s): Epiware Inc.
- Operating system: Linux
- License: GPL
- Website: SSLBridge Homepage (Archived)

SSLBridge was an open source software that allowed users to have access to a network using Samba.

SSLBridge users logged in and navigated the network using an intuitive explorer-style interface programmed in Ajax.
