= Relative identifier =

In the context of the Microsoft Windows NT line of computer operating systems, the relative identifier (RID) is a variable length number that is assigned to objects at creation and becomes part of the object's Security Identifier (SID) that uniquely identifies an account or group within a domain. The Relative ID Master allocates security RIDs to Domain Controllers to assign to new Active Directory security principals (users, groups or computer objects). It also manages objects moving between domains.

The Relative ID Master is one role of the Flexible single master operation for assigning RID.

== See also ==
- Security Identifier
