= Ed Tittel =

Ed Tittel is a freelance writer and trainer who also works as an Internet consultant. He is a graduate of Princeton University and the University of Texas and worked for American software corporation, Novell from 1987–1994, where his final position was Director of Technical Marketing (1993–1994). Prior to that position, he worked for such companies as Information Research Associates (now known as Scientific and Engineering Software), Burroughs Computing, Michael Leesley Consulting, and Schlumberger Research. In 1997, Tittel worked briefly as a Technical Evangelist for Tivoli Systems, and in 2006, he worked for NetQoS, first as Director of Training, then as a Senior Researcher.

Tittel has contributed to over 100 IT, Internet, IT Security, and Certification books. He is well known for his contributions to the best-selling HTML for Dummies and HTML4 for Dummies, and has also authored For Dummies books on XHTML and XML. He's probably best known for his Exam Cram series Certification books, which he originated for the Coriolis Group in 1997, and for which he served as series editor until the end of 2005. His most recent works include short titles on optical networking, clustered computing, and carrier Ethernet, plus recent revisions to his CISSP Study Guide, HTML For Dummies (currently entitled HTML, XHTML, and CSS For Dummies, 6th edition, with co-author Jeff Noble), Windows Server 2008 For Dummies, and Guide to TCP/IP, 3rd edition (lead author: Laura Chappell). Tittel currently writes regularly for numerous TechTarget.com Web sites, for Tom's Hardware and Tom's Guide, for the American Institute of Certified Public Accountants (AICPA), and InformIT.com. He also writes white papers and research documents for major US and international corporations, and develops and delivers online course materials on various Windows OS and networking topics.

In 1993 Tittel started his own Company, LANWrights Inc., primarily to pursue content development and book publishing projects. In 1997, his company produced 45 computer trade books, and from 1998 to 2004 (the year he left the company, following its sale to Sylvan Ventures in 2000) they produced no less than 55 computer trade books per year. In 2005, LANWrights ceased to exist as a business entity when the Austin division of what was by then known as Thomson NETg (now part of Skillsoft) was finally shut down completely.
