= Laura Chappell =

American researcher and educator

Laura Chappell is an American researcher and educator. She is best known as the founder of Chappell University, Wireshark University and the WCNA Certification program (formerly known as the Wireshark Certified Network Analyst program). She has authored several publications on Wireshark including:

- Wireshark Network Analysis: the Official Wireshark Certified Network Analyst Study Guide
- Wireshark 101: Essential Skills for Network Analysis

Chappell's career began in 1989 at Novell, Inc., where she developed an interest in newly emergent Internet and networking technology. She subsequently worked as a road show presenter and course developer.

In October 1993, she founded her first company, the Protocol Analysis Institute, where has served as a Senior Protocol and Security Analyst and creator of the WCNA Certification program, while also delivering presentations and trainings on network forensics for the High Technology Crime Investigation Association (HTCIA).

In December 2006, Chappell founded Wireshark University, which provides a variety of training modalities, including onsite, self-paced, recorded and web-based formats. In January 2009, she founded Chappell University, which has a broader focus, training networking professionals in the use of a variety of TCP/IP topics and tools.

In April 2019, Chappell renamed the Wireshark Certified Network Analyst certification program to the "WCNA Certification program" after Riverbed (sponsor of the Wireshark project) and the Wireshark Foundation had a disagreement with Chappell.
