= NetBIOS =

Networking API and protocol

NetBIOS (/ˈnɛtbaɪɒs/), or Network Basic Input/Output System, is an API that provides services related to the session layer of the OSI model, allowing applications on separate computers to communicate over a local area network. NetBIOS is not a networking protocol; NetBIOS API requests and responses can be transported over several protocols.

The NetBIOS Frames protocol, which transports NetBIOS API requests and responses over IEEE 802.2 LLC, was commonly used as one of the layers of DOS and Microsoft Windows networking in the 1980s and 1990s. It was supported by a number of network operating systems, such as LAN Manager, LAN Server, Windows for Workgroups, Windows 95 and Windows NT.

The NetBIOS over IPX/SPX (NBX) protocol transports NetBIOS API requests and responses over Novell Netware's IPX/SPX protocols.

In modern networks, NetBIOS requests and responses are usually transported over TCP/IP via the NetBIOS over TCP/IP (NBT) protocol. NetBIOS over TCP/IP is also used for identifying system names in TCP/IP networks on Windows.

== History and terminology ==
NetBIOS is an operating system-level API that allows applications on computers to communicate with one another over a local area network (LAN). The API was created in 1983 by Sytek Inc. for software communication over IBM PC Network LAN technology. On IBM PC Network, as an API alone, NetBIOS relied on proprietary Sytek networking protocols for communication over the wire.

In 1985, IBM went forward with the Token Ring network scheme and produced an emulator of Sytek's NetBIOS API to allow NetBIOS-aware applications from the PC-Network era to work over IBM's new Token Ring hardware. This IBM emulator, named NetBIOS Extended User Interface (NetBEUI), expanded the base NetBIOS API created by Sytek with, among other things, the ability to deal with the greater node capacity of Token Ring. A new networking protocol, NetBIOS Frames (NBF), was simultaneously produced by IBM to allow the NetBEUI API to provide its services over Token Ring – specifically, at the IEEE 802.2 Logical Link Control layer; it uses 802.2 type 1 mode to provide the NetBIOS/NetBEUI name service and datagram service, and 802.2 type 2 mode to provide the NetBIOS/NetBEUI session service (virtual circuit).

In 1985, Microsoft created its own implementation of the NetBIOS API for its MS-Net networking technology. As in the case of IBM's Token Ring, the services of Microsoft's NetBIOS implementation were provided over the IEEE 802.2 Logical Link Control layer by the NBF protocol. However, the MS-Net was only delivered to OEMs, and it was actually not a complete product, nor was it ready to communicate on the network in the form it was distributed. It lacked any implementation of OSI Layers 1 to 4 (Physical, Data link, Network and Transport Layers) and an OEM was expected to provide these implementations (in the form of a NetBIOS part) to make its version of MS-Net a complete and ready-to-use product. MS-Net accessed the network through Microsoft's own variant of NetBIOS, which was split into two parts: the lower-level part that OEMs had to provide, implemented the NetBIOS calls that depended on layers 1-4, while the higher-level part, provided by Microsoft, was hardware- and protocol-independent. This NetBIOS implementation supported the full NetBIOS API, but was called by invoking x86 interrupt 0x2A, instead of IBM's standard interrupt 0x5C. The reliance on OEMs to implement parts of NetBIOS had the unfortunate side effect that different OEM versions of MS-Net and NetBIOS generally weren't able to communicate with one another.

In 1986, Novell released Advanced Novell NetWare 2.0, featuring the company's own emulation of the NetBIOS API. Its services were encapsulated within NetWare's IPX/SPX protocol using the NetBIOS over IPX/SPX (NBX) protocol.

In 1987, a method of providing NetBIOS services atop TCP and UDP packets, NetBIOS over TCP/IP (NBT), was published. It was described in RFC 1001 ("Protocol Standard for a NetBIOS Service on a TCP/UDP Transport: Concepts and Methods") and RFC 1002 ("Protocol Standard for a NetBIOS Service on a TCP/UDP Transport: Detailed Specifications"). The NBT protocol was developed in order to "allow an implementation [of NetBIOS applications] to be built on virtually any type of system where the TCP/IP protocol suite is available," and to "allow NetBIOS interoperation in the Internet."

After the PS/2 computer hit the market in 1987, IBM released the PC LAN Support Program, which included a driver offering the NetBIOS API. The NBF protocol was officially supported by Microsoft on almost every version of Windows up to Windows 2000, but its use has decreased quickly since the development of NBT. Microsoft officially dropped support starting with Windows XP, but it is included on the Windows XP CD-ROM and can be installed manually. Windows Vista does not include NetBEUI (means NBF) support at all, but the Windows XP NetBEUI support drivers can be used.

There is some confusion between the names NetBIOS and NetBEUI. NetBEUI originated strictly as the moniker for IBM's enhanced 1985 NetBIOS emulator for Token Ring. The name NetBEUI should have died there, considering that at the time, the NetBIOS implementations by other companies were known simply as NetBIOS regardless of whether they incorporated the API extensions found in Token Ring's emulator. For MS-Net, however, Microsoft elected to name its implementation of the NBF protocol "NetBEUI" – naming its implementation of the transport protocol after IBM's enhanced version of the API. Consequently, Microsoft file and printer sharing over Ethernet often continues to be called NetBEUI, with the name NetBIOS commonly used only in reference to file and printer sharing over TCP/IP. More accurately, the former is NetBIOS Frames (NBF), and the latter is NetBIOS over TCP/IP (NBT).

Because the NBF protocol is unroutable, it can only be used to communicate with devices in the same broadcast domain, but being bridgeable, it can also be used to communicate with network segments connected to each other via bridges. The lack of support for routable networks means that NBF is only well-suited for small to medium-sized networks, where it has an advantage over TCP/IP in that it requires little configuration. The NetBIOS/NetBEUI services must be implemented atop other protocols, such as IPX and TCP/IP (see above), in order to be of use in an internetwork.

Since its original publication in a technical reference book from IBM, the NetBIOS API specification has become a de facto standard in the industry despite originally supporting a maximum of only 80 PCs in a LAN. This limitation was generally overcome industry-wide through the transition from NBF to NBT, under which, for example, Microsoft was able to switch to Domain Name System (DNS) for resolution of NetBIOS hostnames, having formerly used the LAN segment-compartmentalized NBF protocol itself to resolve such names in Windows client-server networks.

== Services ==
NetBIOS provides three distinct services:

- Name service (NetBIOS-NS) for name registration and resolution.
- Datagram distribution service (NetBIOS-DGM) for connectionless communication.
- Session service (NetBIOS-SSN) for connection-oriented communication.

(Note: SMB, an upper layer, is a service that runs on top of the Session Service and the Datagram service, and is not a necessary and integral part of NetBIOS itself. It can now run atop TCP with a small adaptation layer that adds a length field to each SMB message; this is necessary because TCP only provides a byte-stream service with no notion of message boundaries.)

=== Name service ===
In order to start sessions or distribute datagrams, an application must register its NetBIOS name using the name service. NetBIOS names are 16 octets in length and vary based on the particular implementation. Frequently, the 16th octet, called the NetBIOS Suffix, designates the type of resource and can be used to tell other applications what type of services the system offers. In NBT, the name service operates on UDP port 137 (TCP port 137 can also be used, but rarely is).

The name service primitives offered by NetBIOS are:

- Add name – registers a NetBIOS name.
- Add group name – registers a NetBIOS "group" name.
- Delete name – unregisters a NetBIOS name or group name.
- Find name – looks up a NetBIOS name on the network.

Internet Protocol Version 6 (IPv6) is not supported by the NetBIOS name resolution protocol.

=== Datagram distribution service ===
Datagram mode is connectionless; the application is responsible for error detection and recovery. In NBT, the datagram service runs on UDP port 138.

The datagram service primitives offered by NetBIOS are:

- Send Datagram – send a datagram to a remote NetBIOS name.
- Send Broadcast Datagram – send a datagram to all NetBIOS names on the network.
- Receive Datagram – wait for a packet to arrive from a Send Datagram operation.
- Receive Broadcast Datagram – wait for a packet to arrive from a Send Broadcast Datagram operation.

=== Session service ===
Session mode lets two computers establish a connection, allows messages to span multiple packets, and provides error detection and recovery. In NBT, the session service runs on TCP port 139.

The session service primitives offered by NetBIOS are:

- Call – opens a session to a remote NetBIOS name.
- Listen – listen for attempts to open a session to a NetBIOS name.
- Hang Up – close a session.
- Send – sends a packet to the computer on the other end of a session.
- Send No Ack – like Send, but doesn't require an acknowledgment.
- Receive – wait for a packet to arrive from a Send on the other end of a session.

In the original protocol used to implement NetBIOS services on PC-Network, to establish a session, the initiating computer sends an Open request, which is answered by an Open acknowledgment. The computer that started the session will then send a Session Request packet, which will prompt either a Session Accept or Session Reject packet.

During an established session, each transmitted packet is answered by either a positive acknowledgment (ACK) or a negative acknowledgment (NAK) response. A NAK will prompt retransmission of the data. Sessions are closed by the non-initiating computer by sending a close request. The computer that started the session will reply with a close response, which prompts the final session closed packet.

== NetBIOS name vs Internet hostname ==
When NetBIOS is run in conjunction with Internet protocols (e.g., NBT), each computer may have multiple names: one or more NetBIOS name service names and one or more Internet hostnames.

=== NetBIOS name ===
A NetBIOS name is 16 ASCII characters; however, Microsoft limits the hostname to 15 characters and reserves the 16th character as a NetBIOS Suffix. This suffix describes the service or name record type, such as host record, master browser record, or domain controller record or other services. The hostname (or short hostname) for a host is specified when Windows networking is installed or configured on the host; the suffixes registered are determined by the individual services supplied by the host. In order to connect to a computer running TCP/IP via its NetBIOS name, the name must be resolved to a network address. Today, this is usually an IP address (the NetBIOS name-to-IP address resolution is often done by either broadcasts or a WINS Server – NetBIOS Name Server). A computer's NetBIOS name is often the same as that computer's hostname (see below), although truncated to 15 characters, but it may also be completely different.

NetBIOS names are a sequence of alphanumeric characters. The following characters are explicitly not permitted: \/:*?"<>|. Since Windows 2000, NetBIOS names also had to comply with restrictions on DNS names: they cannot consist entirely of digits, and the hyphen ("-") or full-stop (".") characters may not appear as the first or last character. Since Windows 2000, Microsoft has advised against including any full-stop (".") characters in NetBIOS names, such that applications can use the presence of a full-stop to distinguish domain names from NetBIOS names.

The Windows LMHOSTS file provides a NetBIOS name resolution method that can be used for small networks that do not use a WINS server.

=== Internet hostname ===
A Windows machine's NetBIOS name is not to be confused with the computer's Internet hostname (assuming that the computer is also an Internet host in addition to being a NetBIOS node, which need not necessarily be the case). Generally, a computer running Internet protocols (whether it is a Windows machine or not) usually has a hostname (also sometimes called a machine name). Originally, these names were stored in and provided by a hosts file but today most such names are part of the hierarchical Domain Name System (DNS).

Generally, the hostname of a Windows computer is based on the NetBIOS name plus the Primary DNS Suffix, which are both set in the System Properties dialog box. There may also be connection-specific suffixes which can be viewed or changed on the DNS tab in Control Panel → Network → TCP/IP → Advanced Properties. Hostnames are used by applications such as telnet, ftp, web browsers, etc. To connect to a computer running the TCP/IP protocol using its name, the hostname must be resolved into an IP address, typically by a DNS server. (It is also possible to operate many TCP/IP-based applications, including the three listed above, using only IP addresses, but this is not the norm.)

== Node types ==
Under Windows, the node type of a networked computer relates to the way it resolves NetBIOS names to IP addresses. This assumes that there are IP addresses for the NetBIOS nodes, which is assured only when NetBIOS operates over NBT; thus, node types are not a property of NetBIOS per se but of interaction between NetBIOS and TCP/IP in the Windows OS environment. There are four node types.

- B-node: 0x01 Broadcast
- P-node: 0x02 Peer (WINS only)
- M-node: 0x04 Mixed (broadcast, then WINS)
- H-node: 0x08 Hybrid (WINS, then broadcast)

The node type in use is displayed by opening a command line and typing ipconfig /all. A Windows computer registry may also be configured in such a way as to display "unknown" for the node type.

== NetBIOS suffixes ==
The NetBIOS Suffix, alternately called the NetBIOS End Character (endchar), is the 16th character of a NetBIOS name and indicates service type for the registered name. The number of record types is limited to 255; some commonly used values are:

For unique names:

- 00: Workstation Service (workstation name)
- 03: Windows Messenger service
- 06: Remote Access Service
- 20: File Service (also called Host Record)
- 21: Remote Access Service client
- 1B: Domain Master Browser – Primary Domain Controller for a domain
- 1D: Master Browser

For group names:

- 00: Workstation Service (workgroup/domain name)
- 1C: Domain Controllers for a domain (group record with up to 25 IP addresses)
- 1E: Browser Service Elections

== Protocol stack ==
The following table shows a brief history of NetBIOS and its related protocols. SMB was the main protocol that used NetBIOS. SMB enables Windows File and Printer Sharing.

7	Application layer		Windows Chat, ClipBook Viewer, Microsoft Hearts	SMB	SMB	SMB	SMB	SMB
6	Presentation layer		NetDDE	SMB	SMB	SMB	SMB	SMB
5	Session layer	NetBIOS (The original "Network Basic Input/Output System")	NetBIOS Frames (incorrectly labeled as "NetBEUI" in Windows)		NetBIOS over IPX/SPX	NetBIOS over TCP/IP	SMB	SMB
4	Transport layer	NetBIOS (The original "Network Basic Input/Output System")	NetBIOS Frames (incorrectly labeled as "NetBEUI" in Windows)		IPX/SPX	TCP/UDP	TCP/UDP	QUIC (over UDP)
3	Network layer	NetBIOS (The original "Network Basic Input/Output System")	NetBIOS Frames (incorrectly labeled as "NetBEUI" in Windows)		IPX	IP	IP	IP
2	Data link layer	NetBIOS (The original "Network Basic Input/Output System")	IEEE 802.2 on Ethernet, Token Ring		Any link that carries IPX	Any link that carries IP	Any link that carries IP	Any link that carries IP
1	Physical layer	IBM PC Network	Ethernet, Token Ring					
First supported			Windows for Workgroups 3.1		Windows for Workgroups 3.1	Windows NT 3.5	Windows 2000	Windows 11 (Server side requires Windows Server 2022 Datacenter: Azure Edition)
Last supported			Windows XP (requires manual install)		Windows XP			

== See also ==
- mDNS
- NetBIOS over TCP/IP (NBT)
- Server Message Block (SMB)
