= Workgroup (computer networking) =

Peer-to-peer computer network

In computer networking a work group is a collection of computers connected on a LAN that share the common resources and responsibilities. Workgroup is Microsoft's term for a peer-to-peer local area network. Computers running Microsoft operating systems in the same work group may share files, printers, or Internet connection. Work group contrasts with a domain, in which computers rely on centralized authentication.

== See also ==
- Windows for Workgroups – the earliest version of Windows to allow a work group
- Windows HomeGroup – a feature introduced in Windows 7 and later removed in Windows 10 (Version 1803) that allows work groups to share contents more easily
- Browser service – the service enabled 'browsing' all the resources in work groups
- Peer Name Resolution Protocol (PNRP) - IPv6-based dynamic name publication and resolution
