= Domain controller (Windows) =

Windows server computer

On Microsoft Servers, a domain controller (DC) is a server computer that responds to security authentication requests (logging in, etc.) within a Windows domain. A domain is a concept introduced in Windows NT whereby a user may be granted access to a number of computer resources with the use of a single username and password combination.

== History ==
One domain controller per domain was configured as the primary domain controller (PDC); all other domain controllers were backup domain controllers (BDC).

Because of the critical nature of the PDC, best practices dictated that the PDC should be dedicated solely to domain services, and not used for file, print or application services that could slow down or crash the system. Some network administrators took the additional step of having a dedicated BDC online for the express purpose of being available for promotion if the PDC failed.

A BDC could authenticate the users in a domain, but all updates to the domain could only be made via the PDC, which would then propagate these changes to all BDCs in the domain. If the PDC was unavailable the update would fail. If the PDC was permanently unavailable an existing BDC could be promoted to be one. Later versions introduced Active Directory ("AD"), which largely eliminated the concept of PDC and BDC in favor of multi-master replication. However, there are still several roles that only one domain controller can perform, called the flexible single master operation roles. Some of these roles must be filled by one DC per domain, while others only require one DC per AD Forest. If the server performing one of these roles is lost, the domain can still function, and if the server will not be available again, an administrator can designate an alternate DC to assume the role in a process known as "seizing" the role.

== Primary domain controller ==
In Windows NT 4, one DC serves as the primary domain controller (PDC). Others, if they exist, are usually a backup domain controller (BDC). The PDC is typically designated as the "first". The "User Manager for Domains" is a utility for maintaining user/group information. It uses the domain security database on the primary controller. The PDC has the master copy of the user accounts database which it can access and modify. The BDC computers have a copy of this database, but these copies are read-only. The PDC will replicate its account database to the BDCs on a regular basis. The BDCs exist in order to provide a backup to the PDC, and can also be used to authenticate users logging on to the network. If a PDC should fail, one of the BDCs can then be promoted to take its place. The PDC will usually be the first domain controller that was created unless it was replaced by a promoted BDC.

=== PDC emulation (Primary Domain Controller) ===
In modern releases of Windows, domains have been supplemented by the use of Active Directory services. In Active Directory domains, the concept of primary and secondary domain controller relationships no longer applies. PDC emulators hold the accounts databases and administrative tools. As a result, a heavy workload can slow the system down. The DNS service may be installed on a secondary emulator machine to relieve the workload on the PDC emulator. The same rules apply; only one PDC may exist on a domain, but multiple replication servers may still be used.

- The PDC emulator master acts in place of the PDC if there are Windows NT 4.0 domain controllers (BDCs) remaining within the domain, acting as a source for them to replicate from.
- The PDC emulator master receives preferential replication of password changes within the domain. As password changes take time to replicate across all the domain controllers in an Active Directory domain, the PDC emulator master receives notification of password changes immediately, and if a logon attempt fails at another domain controller, that domain controller will forward the logon request to the PDC emulator master before rejecting it.
- The PDC emulator master also serves as the machine to which all domain controllers in the domain will synchronise their clocks. It, in turn, should be configured to synchronise to an external NTP time source.

=== Samba ===
Primary Domain Controllers (PDC) have been faithfully recreated on the Samba emulation of Microsoft's SMB client/server system. Samba has the capability to emulate an NT 4.0 domain, as well as modern Active Directory Domain Services on a Linux machine.

== Backup domain controller ==
In Windows NT 4 domains, the backup domain controller (BDC) is a computer that has a copy of the user accounts database. Unlike the accounts database on the PDC, the BDC database is a read-only copy. When changes are made to the master accounts database on the PDC, the PDC pushes the updates down to the BDCs. These additional domain controllers exist to provide fault tolerance. If the PDC fails, then it can be replaced by a BDC. In such circumstances, an administrator promotes a BDC to be the new PDC. BDCs can also authenticate user logon requests and take some of the authentication load from the PDC.

When Windows 2000 was released, the NT domain as found in NT 4 and prior versions was replaced by Active Directory. In Active Directory domains running in native mode, the concept of the PDC and BDC do not exist. In these domains, all domain controllers are considered equals. A side effect of this change is the loss of ability to create a "read-only" domain controller. Windows Server 2008 reintroduced this capability.

== Nomenclature ==
Windows Server can be one of three kinds: Active Directory "domain controllers" (ones that provide identity and authentication), Active Directory "member servers" (ones that provide complementary services such as file repositories and schema) and Windows Workgroup "stand-alone servers". The term "Active Directory Server" is sometimes used by Microsoft as synonymous to "Domain Controller" but the term is discouraged.
