= Windows Internet Name Service =

Microsoft's implementation of NetBIOS Name Service

Windows Internet Name Service (WINS) is a Microsoft name resolution service, introduced in 1994 with Windows NT 3.5, for translating NetBIOS names to IP addresses. NetBIOS names are an older naming convention used for local name resolution before DNS became ubiquitous. WINS is mostly unnecessary for modern networks unless legacy systems require it. The rise of DNS, especially through Microsoft's Active Directory service's DNS support, made WINS effectively obsolete by the mid-2000s. Microsoft documentation advises not to use WINS on networks not requiring it.

== Details ==
WINS is Microsoft's implementation of the NetBIOS Name Service (NBNS), a name server and service for NetBIOS computer names. Effectively, WINS is to NetBIOS names what DNS is to domain names — a central mapping of host names to network addresses. Like DNS, it is implemented in two parts: a server service (that manages the embedded Jet Database, server-to-server replication, service requests, and conflicts) and a TCP/IP client component which manages the client's registration and renewal of names, and takes care of queries.

On November 21st, 2025, Microsoft announced that Server 2025 will be the last release to support WINS.
