= Windows domain =

Type of computer network

A Windows domain is a form of a computer network in which all user accounts, computers, printers and other security principals, are registered with a central database located on one or more clusters of central computers known as domain controllers. Authentication takes place on domain controllers. Each person who uses computers within a domain receives a unique user account that can then be assigned access to resources within the domain. Starting with Windows Server 2000, Active Directory is the Windows component in charge of maintaining that central database. The concept of Windows domain is in contrast with that of a workgroup in which each computer maintains its own database of security principals.

== Configuration ==
Computers can connect to a domain via LAN, WAN or using a VPN connection. Users of a domain are able to use enhanced security for their VPN connection due to the support for a certification authority which is gained when a domain is added to a network, and as a result, smart cards and digital certificates can be used to confirm identities and protect stored information.

=== Domain controller ===
In a Windows domain, the directory resides on computers that are configured as domain controllers. A domain controller is a Windows or Samba server that manages all security-related aspects between user and domain interactions, centralizing security and administration. A domain controller is generally suitable for networks with more than 10 PCs. A domain is a logical grouping of computers. The computers in a domain can share physical proximity on a small LAN or they can be located in different parts of the world. As long as they can communicate, their physical location is irrelevant.

=== Integration ===
Where PCs running a Windows operating system must be integrated into a domain that includes non-Windows PCs, the free software package Samba is a suitable alternative. Whichever package is used to control it, the database contains the user accounts and security information for the resources in that domain.

== Active Directory ==
Computers inside an Active Directory domain can be assigned into organizational units according to location, organizational structure, or other factors. In the original Windows Server Domain system (shipped with Windows NT 3.x/4), machines could only be viewed in two states from the administration tools; computers detected (on the network), and computers that actually belonged to the domain. Active Directory makes it easier for administrators to manage and deploy network changes and policies (see Group Policy) to all of the machines connected to the domain.

== Workgroups ==
Windows Workgroups, by contrast, is the other model for grouping computers running Windows in a networking environment which ships with Windows. Workgroup computers are considered to be 'standalone' - i.e. there is no formal membership or authentication process formed by the workgroup. A workgroup does not have servers and clients, and hence represents the peer-to-peer (or client-to-client) networking paradigm, rather than the centralized architecture constituted by Server-Client. Workgroups are considered difficult to manage beyond a dozen clients, and lack single sign on, scalability, resilience/disaster recovery functionality, and many security features. Windows Workgroups are more suitable for small or home-office networks.

== See also ==
- Active Directory
- Security Accounts Manager (SAM)
