= SUSE LINUX =

SUSE LINUX may refer to:

- SUSE Linux Enterprise, a commercial opensource distribution by SUSE S.A.
- openSUSE, an open-source Linux distribution
