= GeckoLinux =

GeckoLinux distribution

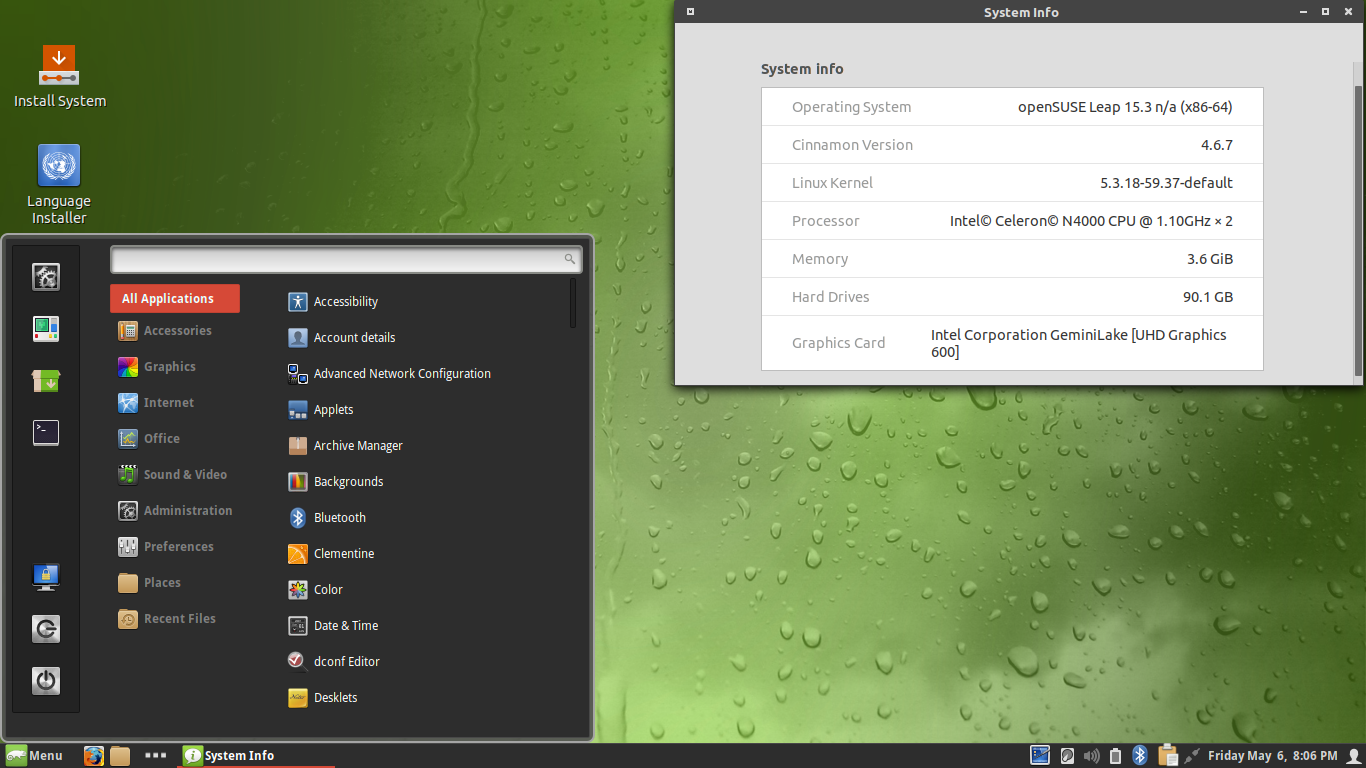
- GeckoLinux 153.220104, with the Cinnamon desktop environment
- OS family: Unix-like (Linux kernel)
- Working state: Current
- Source model: Open source, with proprietary drivers and media codecs available or provided by default
- Initial release: 27 May 2016; 10 years ago
- Latest release: Static: 154.220822 / 27 August 2022; 3 years ago; Rolling: 999.220820 / 27 August 2022; 3 years ago
- Repository: github.com/geckolinux
- Available in: Multilingual
- Package manager: Zypper, YaST (Graphical)
- Supported platforms: x86-64
- Kernel type: Monolithic (Linux)
- Userland: GNU
- Default user interface: Cinnamon, Xfce, GNOME, KDE, MATE, Budgie, LXQt, Pantheon
- Official website: geckolinux.github.io

GeckoLinux is a dormant Linux distribution based on openSUSE. It is available in two editions: Static, which is based on openSUSE Leap, and Rolling, which is based on openSUSE Tumbleweed.

== Features ==
Some of GeckoLinux's features include:

- "improved" font rendering
- live ISO's with various desktop environments
- offline calamares installer
- PackageKit is not used or installed by default
- pre-configured Packman repository (Note: "GeckoLinux prefers packages from the Packman repo when they are available, whereas some of openSUSE's default packages don't work with patent-restricted features even if the features are installed from other sources.")
- proprietary media codecs & drivers are pre-installed
- recommended packages are not forcefully installed as recommended dependencies after installation
- TLP for power management

== Version history ==
=== Static ===
Version	Date	Kernel
421.160527	27.05.2016	Unknown.
421.160601	01.06.2016	Unknown.
421.160605	06.06.2016	Unknown.
421.160627	27.06.2016	Unknown.
421.161103	05.11.2016	Unknown.
422.161213	16.12.2016	4.4.36
422.161228	30.12.2016	4.4.36
422.170124	25.01.2017	4.4.36
422.170205	06.02.2017	4.4.36
422.170215	16.02.2017	4.4.36
422.170302	03.03.2017	4.4.36
422.170303	04.03.2017	4.4.36
423.171028	29.10.2017	4.4.104
423.180105	06.01.2018	4.4.104
423.180107	08.01.2018	4.4.104
150.180607	07.06.2018	4.12.14
150.180616	16.06.2018	4.12.14
152.210223	23.02.2021	5.3.18
154.220822	22.08.2022	5.14.21

=== Rolling ===
Version	Date	Kernel
999.160614	16.06.2016	Unknown.
999.161031	04.11.2016	Unknown.
999.161218	20.12.2016	Unknown.
999.161230	31.12.2016	Unknown.
999.170124	25.01.2017	Unknown.
999.170205	06.02.2017	Unknown.
999.170302	04.03.2017	Unknown.
999.180607	07.06.2018	4.16.12
999.220820	20.08.2022	5.19.1

== Reception ==
Dedoimedo wrote a non-positive review of GeckoLinux 150.180616, saying that it had "issues with multimedia playback, visual glitches and the graphics driver". A subsequent review of GeckoLinux Static 152 in February 2021 was more positive.

Jack M. Germain explains how & why "GeckoLinux doing for the OpenSuse/Suse world much of what Linux Mint did for the Ubuntu universe".

== Gallery ==
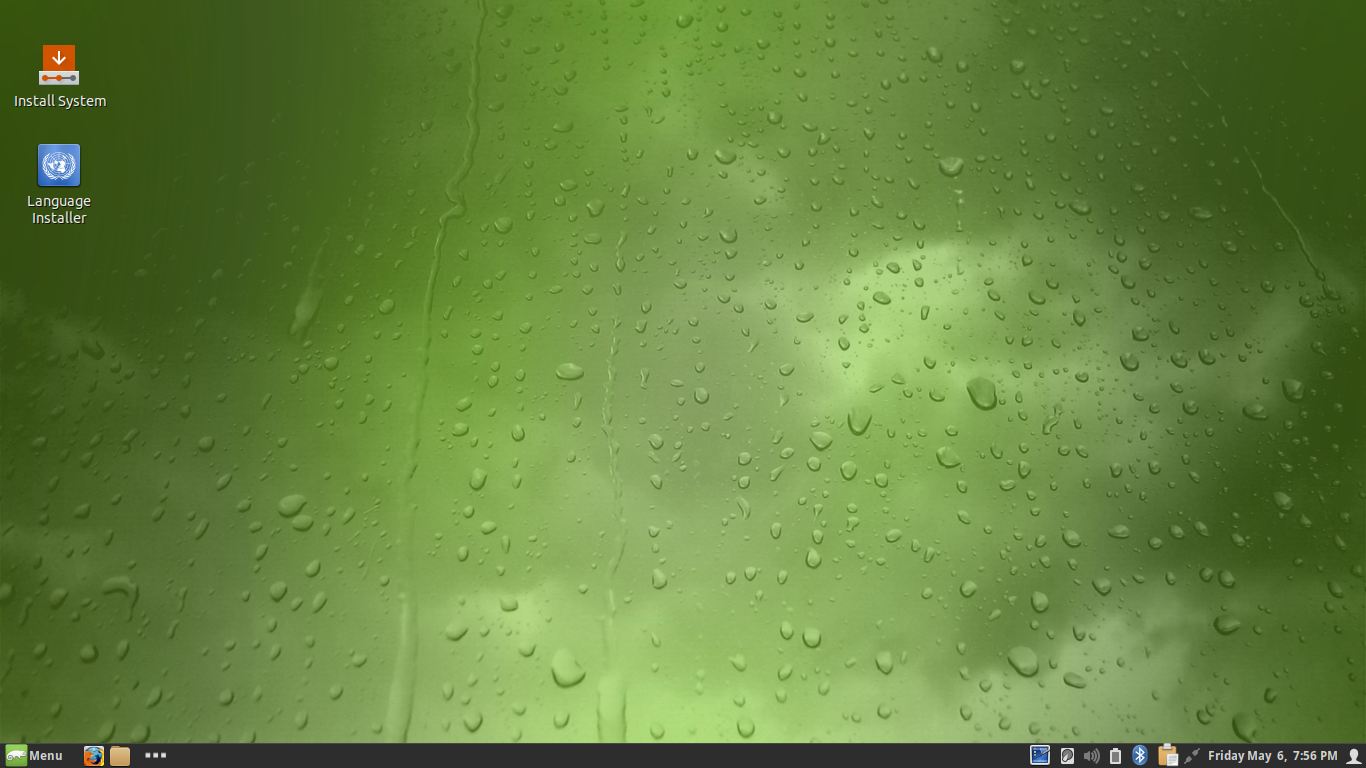

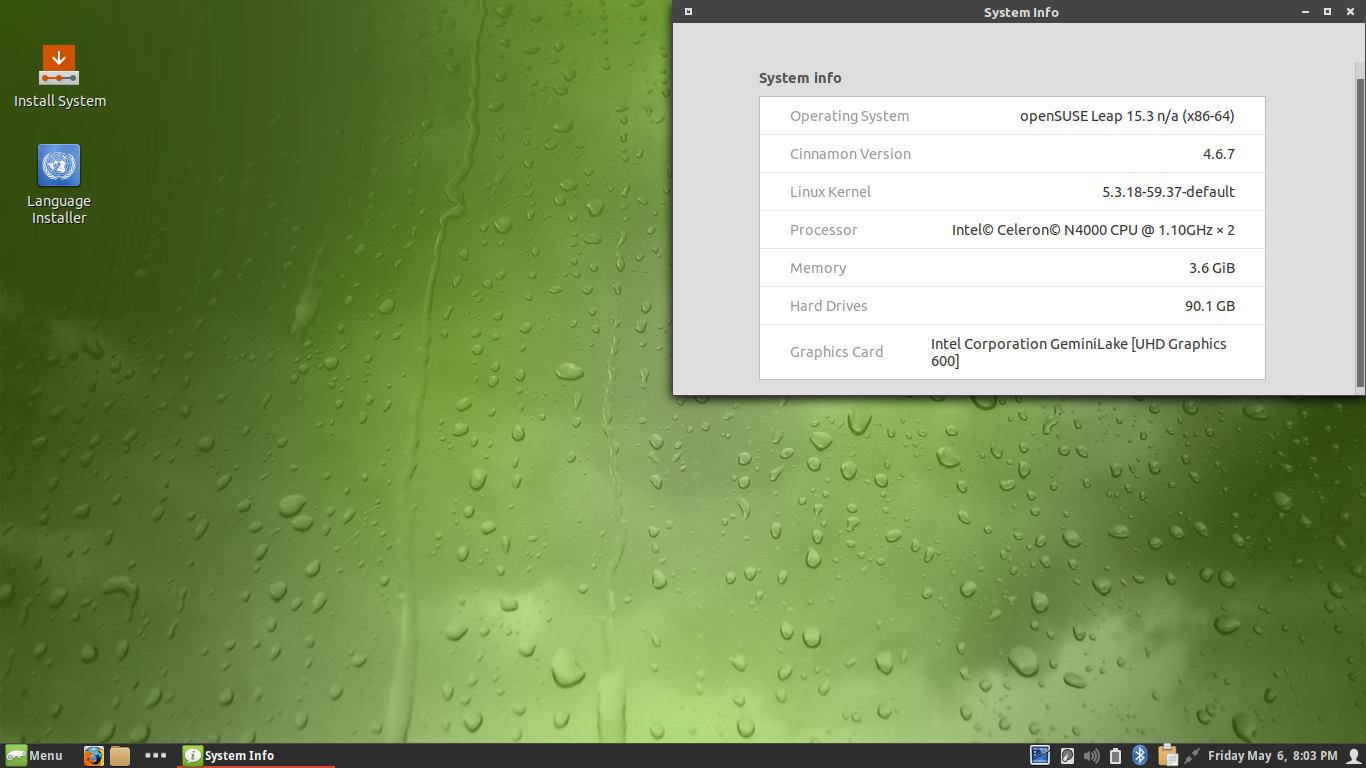

== See also ==
- openSUSE
- Rolling release
