= SUSE Linux Enterprise =

Linux distribution

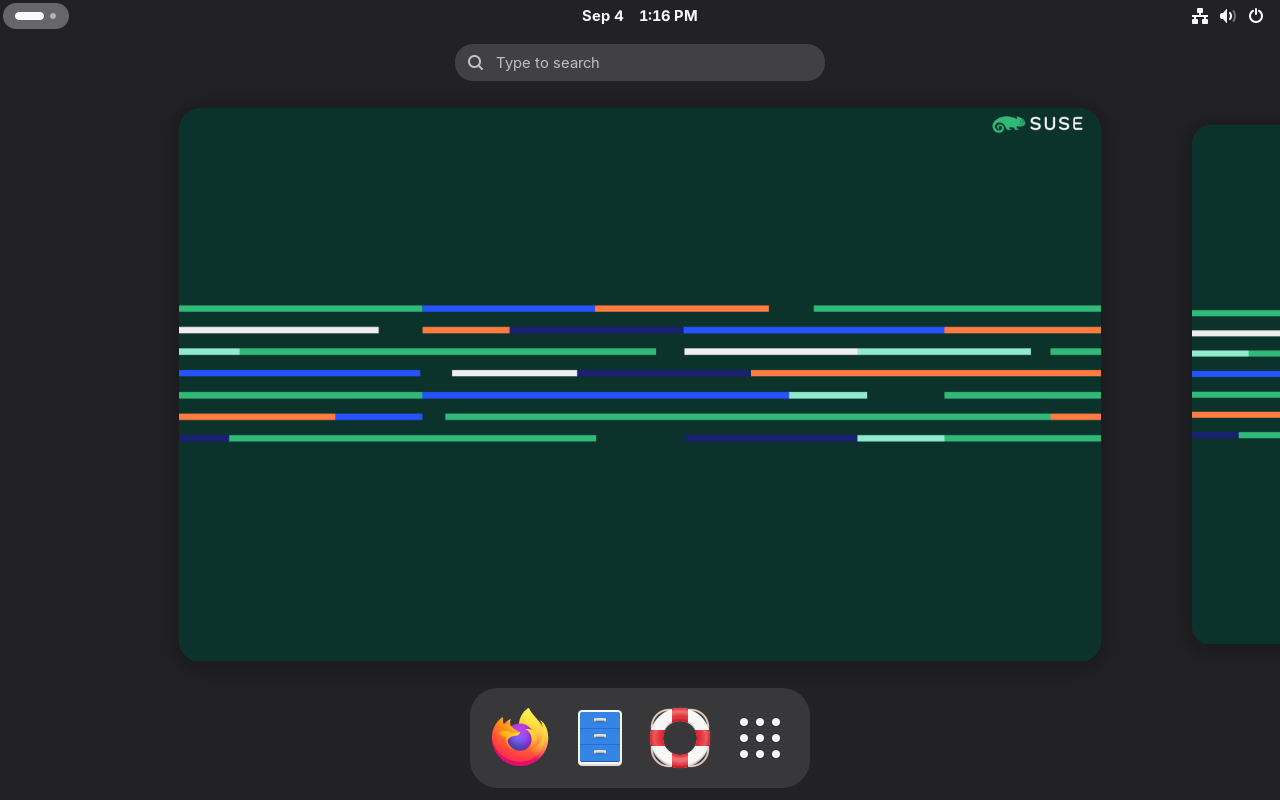
- SUSE Linux Enterprise Server 16.0 with default GNOME Shell desktop
- Developer: SUSE S.A.
- OS family: Linux (Unix-like)
- Working state: Current
- Source model: Open source
- General availability: 4 November 2025; 12 months ago
- Latest release: 16.1
- Marketing target: Commercial market (mainframes, servers, workstations, supercomputers)
- Available in: Multilingual
- Update method: Zypper, YaST
- Package manager: RPM Package Manager
- Supported platforms: x86-64, ARM64, s390x, IBM Power, IBM Z
- Kernel type: Monolithic (Linux)
- Userland: GNU
- Default user interface: GNOME
- License: GNU General Public License and various
- Official website: www.suse.com/products/server/ www.suse.com/products/desktop/

SUSE Linux Enterprise (SLE) is a Linux-based operating system developed by SUSE. It is available in two editions, suffixed with Server (SLES) for servers and mainframes, and Desktop (SLED) for workstations and desktop computers.

Its major versions are released at an interval of three–four years, while minor versions (called "Service Packs" until SLE 15 or "Minor Release" starting with SLE 16) are released about every 12 months. SUSE Linux Enterprise products receive more intense testing than the upstream openSUSE community product, with the intention that only mature, stable versions of the included components will make it through to the released enterprise product. It is developed from a common code base with other SUSE Linux Enterprise products.

IBM's Watson was built on IBM's POWER7 systems using SLES. Hewlett Packard Enterprise's Frontier, world's first exascale supercomputer runs on SUSE's SLES 15 (HPE Cray OS).

== SUSE Linux Enterprise Server ==
SLES was developed based on SUSE Linux by a small team led by Marcus Kraft and Bernhard Kaindl as principal developer who were supported by Joachim "Jos" Schröder. It was first released on 31 October 2000 as a version for IBM S/390 mainframe machines. In December 2000, the first enterprise client (Telia) was made public. In April 2001, the first SLES for x86 was released.

From a business perspective, SLES is not only a technical offering, but also has entangled a commercial offering (services and support). The initial business model was inspired by recurrent charges established in the mainframe world at this time, and innovated by Jürgen Geck and Malcom Yates. Based on customer needs and feedback as well as other evolving Linux based offerings the business model has been reworked by different people in the subsequent years until today.

SUSE Linux Enterprise Server 9 (SLES 9) was released in August 2004. Service Pack 4 was released in December 2007. It was supported by hardware vendors including IBM, HP, Sun Microsystems, Dell, SGI, Lenovo, and Fujitsu Siemens Computers.

SUSE Linux Enterprise Server 10 (SLES 10) was released in July 2006, and is also supported by the major hardware vendors. Service pack 4 was released in April 2011. SLES 10 shared a common codebase with SUSE Linux Enterprise Desktop 10—Novell's desktop distribution for business use—and other SUSE Linux Enterprise products.

SUSE Linux Enterprise Server 11 (SLES 11) was released on 24 March 2009 and included Linux kernel 2.6.27, Oracle Cluster File System Release 2, support for the OpenAIS cluster communication protocol for server and storage clustering, and Mono 2.0. SLES 11 SP1 (released May 2010) rebased the kernel version to 2.6.32. In February 2012, SLES 11 SP2 was released, based on kernel version 3.0.10. SLES 11 SP2 included a Consistent Network Device Naming feature for Dell servers.

SUSE Linux Enterprise Server 12 (SLES 12) beta was made available on 25 February 2014, and the final version was released on 27 October 2014. SLES 12 SP1 was released on 18 December 2015. SP1 added Docker, Shibboleth, Network Teaming, and JeOS images. SP2 was released on 11 November 2016. SP3 was released on 7 September 2017.

The SLES 13 and SLES 14 version numbers were skipped due to superstitions associated with those numbers in certain cultures.

SUSE Linux Enterprise Server 15 (SLES 15) beta 1 was released on 18 October 2017, and the final version was released on 16 July 2018. SLES 15 SP2, which updates the kernel, PostgreSQL, Samba, Salt and many other parts of the operating system, was released on 21 July 2020.

SUSE Linux Enterprise Server 16 (SLES 16) was released on 4 November 2025. SLES 16 introduced SELinux as default Linux Security Module replacing AppArmor and deprecated YaST. Starting with SLES 16, Service Pack was replaced with Minor Release and Long Term Service Pack Support (LTSS) was replaced with Long Term Support (LTS).

== SUSE Linux Enterprise Desktop ==
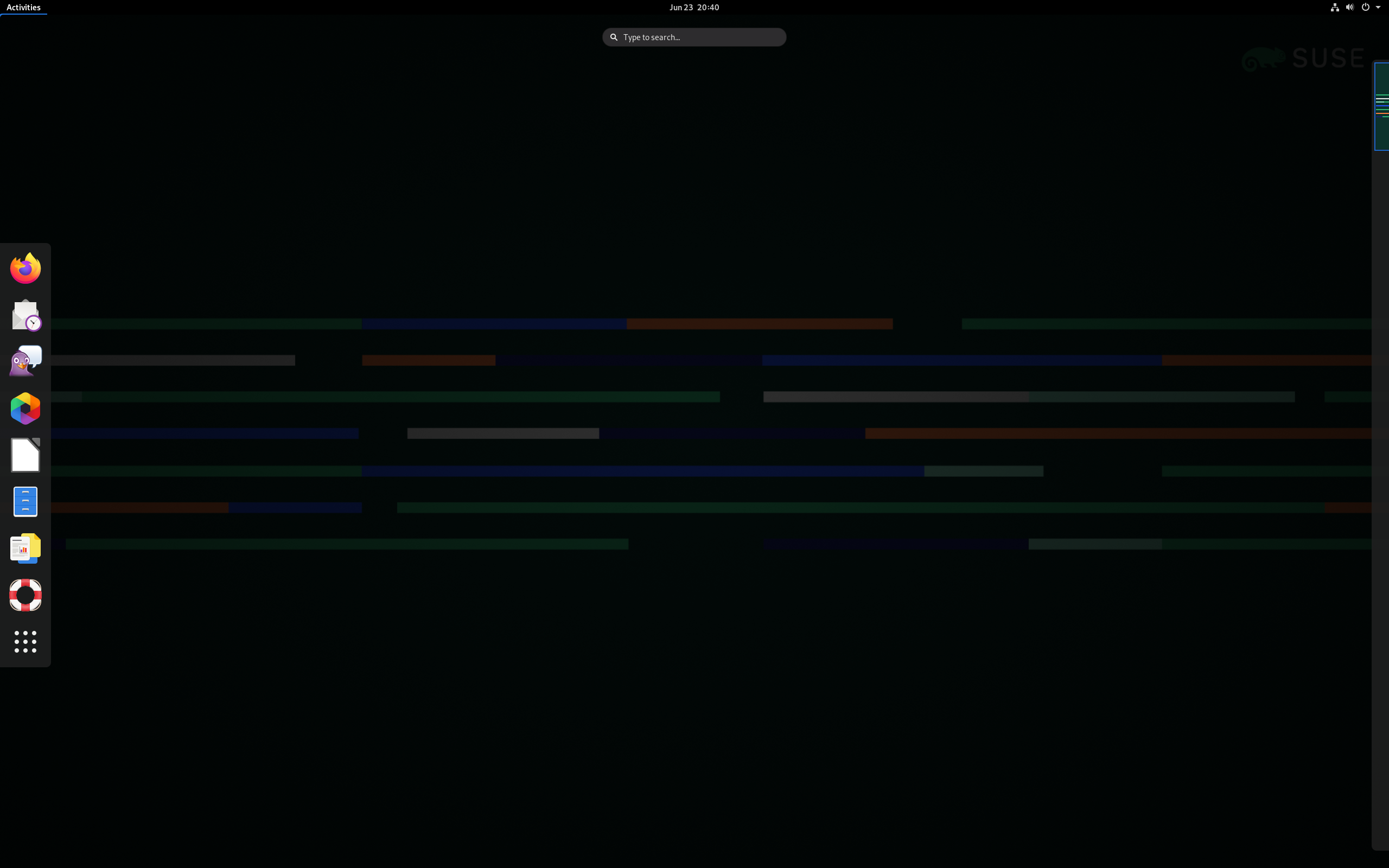
SUSE Linux Enterprise Desktop 15 SP3

SUSE Linux Enterprise Desktop (SLED), introduced as Novell Linux Desktop (NLD), targeted at the business market, it is developed from a common codebase with SUSE Linux Enterprise Server (SLES) and other SUSE Linux Enterprise (SLE) products. SLED includes the GNOME Shell, LibreOffice, Evolution and many other popular open source packages such as Dia, TigerVNC, and lftp. Like SLES, SLED is based on openSUSE Tumbleweed and shares a common codebase with openSUSE Leap.

SLED since version 12 has included a modified version of the GNOME Classic Shell to include a layout with one panel on the bottom of the screen, traditional application menus, and desktop icons for traditional desktop users. It also includes LibreOffice, Mozilla Firefox, and Evolution along with many standard GNOME utilities, such as GNOME Documents and GNOME Files. As well, the YaST Control Center allows end users to make advanced changes to the system from the command line.

HP offers business notebooks with SLED 11 preinstalled, under both its own brand and the Compaq brand.

Micro-Star International offered MSI Wind Netbooks with SLED 10 preinstalled. Sun Microsystems previously licensed SLED as the basis of the Linux version of Java Desktop System.

In March 2018, SUSE Product Manager Jay Kruemcke wrote in SUSE blog that SUSE Linux Enterprise developers have ported it to Raspberry Pi.

Costs online in 2025, June: support standard 1 year subscription 139,23€; support priority 1 year subscription 254,66€

=== History ===
SUSE Linux Enterprise Desktop has been developed while SUSE was under the ownership of several different parent companies. SUSE was owned by and conducted business as Novell from SLED's first release as Novell Linux Desktop in 2004 until 2011 when The Attachmate Group purchased Novell and created SUSE as an autonomous subsidiary. Micro Focus in turn purchased The Attachmate Group in 2014 and made SUSE an autonomous business unit, before selling it to EQT AB in 2019. EQT AB is a private equity group that develops new companies before divesting them as independent companies.

Novell Linux Desktop 9

Novell Linux Desktop (NLD) 9 was originally released on 8 November 2004, less than a year after Novell's acquisition of SUSE. There were a number of Service Packs (SP's) released for NLD 9. SP1 was released on 11 February 2005 and contained many updates. After that, SP2 was released on 9 August 2005, containing all the released updates and bugfixes since August 2004. SP3 was released on 22 December 2005.

NLD 9 was based on SUSE Linux 9.1 and offered a more conservative offering of desktop applications for businesses. Its desktop included common end user applications like Mozilla Firefox, OpenOffice.org. NLD also included software developed by Novell and its 2003 acquisition Ximian, such as the Red Carpet software management tool from Ximian and Novell's system management tool ZenWorks.

SUSE Linux Enterprise Desktop 10

With SLED 10, Novell increased the focus on features for a broader range of corporate users by focusing on meeting the needs for basic office workers, positioning SLED as a competitor to Microsoft Windows. Basic office workers were defined in this context as users who need basic desktop functionality, including an office suite, a collaboration client, a web browser, and instant messaging. Novell attempts to meet these needs by concentrating on making these components very compatible with existing enterprise infrastructure, such as Microsoft Office data files, Microsoft Active Directory, and Microsoft Exchange Server or Novell GroupWise collaboration systems.

It also included the Beagle desktop search tool, similar to Spotlight in Mac OS X v10.4. The Xgl+Compiz support enables a variety of advanced graphical effects in the user interface, such as "application tiling" (similar to Exposé). Other features include making it easier for Linux beginners to connect digital cameras to the computer and play audio files such as MP3s using Helix Banshee. The version of GNOME included this release was highly customized, and debuted the slab application menu on a one panel layout. SLED 10 was originally released on 17 June 2006. The last service pack for SLED 10 was Service Pack 4, released on 15 April 2011.

SUSE Linux Enterprise Desktop 11

SLED 11, based on openSUSE 11.1, was released on 24 March 2009. It included an upgrade to GNOME and was the first release to ship KDE 4, with version 4.1.3. Several improvements were made to improve Microsoft Active Directory and Microsoft Exchange Server integration, and the Novell OpenOffice.org version was upgraded to version 3.0. SLED continued to include some proprietary components such as Adobe Flash, as well as open-source implementations of closed sourced plugins and runtimes such as Moonlight and Mono.

Four service packs were released for SLED 11, with Service Pack 2 notably bringing Btrfs commercial support to the enterprise Linux market and including the snapper tool to manage Btrfs snapshots. The most current service pack, SP 4, was released on 17 July 2015.

SUSE Linux Enterprise Desktop 12

On 28 October 2014, SUSE (now an independent business unit) released SLED 12 built on openSUSE 13.1. SLED 12 introduced several new technological upgrades, including systemd, GNOME 3, GRUB 2, plymouth, and the in-house built wicked wireless network manager. SLED 12 also included further stability and integration with BtrFS. With the transition to GNOME 3, the GNOME Classic Shell, the vanilla GNOME Shell, and a SLE Classic Shell with a design that more closely mimics the slab layout were included. KDE, the default desktop environment in openSUSE, and support for 32-bit x86 processors were dropped from the enterprise distribution.

SLE 12 Service Pack 1 was the first to be the basis for openSUSE's more conservative Leap series, with openSUSE Leap 42.1 sharing its codebase with SLE 12 SP1. Leap 42.2 and 42.3 were built from the same codebase as SLE 12 SP2 and SLE SP3 respectively. SLED 12's underlying base, SUSE Linux Enterprise Server 12, was the first version of SLE to be offered on the Microsoft Store to be run on the Windows Subsystem for Linux.

SUSE Linux Enterprise Desktop 15

SLE skipped over versions 13 and 14, realigning the versions of openSUSE Leap and SLE at version 15. SLE 15 was released on 25 June 2018 with the same codebase as openSUSE Leap 15.0. SLED 15 included major upgrades to GNOME 3.26, LibreOffice 6.0, GCC 7 and LTS kernel version 4.12. Version 15 also made the Wayland implementation of GNOME the default. SLES and SLED can now also be installed from the same media. SLED 15 offers the same GNOME Desktop options as SLED 12.

SLE 15 SP1 shares a common codebase with openSUSE Leap 15.1. SLE 15 SP 1 includes improvements to the ability to migrate from openSUSE Leap to SLE, increased 64-bit Arm System on a Chip (SoC) supported processor options, transactional updates, and various other features.

SLE 15 SP3 features a unified repository with same source code and binary packages with openSUSE Leap 15.3.

=== People ===
Novell's effort on SUSE Linux Enterprise Desktop 10 was led by Nat Friedman, one of the two founders of Ximian. Nat was aided by a host of former Ximian and SUSE developers, with product manager Guy Lunardi and engineering manager Kelli Frame.

=== Derivatives ===
Through SUSE Studio Express, users can create custom appliances based on SUSE Linux Distributions including SLED. Options for SLE allow for the creation of derivative distributions as custom Kiwi and docker containers with customized package choices and configuration parameters.

== Administrative tools ==
There are two suites of administrative tools used on SUSE Linux Enterprise, one is the suite introduced with SLE 16.0 consisting of Agama (system installer), Cockpit (configuration tool), and Mylryn (package management) and another one is YaST used with SLE 15 and older versions of SLE.

Agama

Agama is the system installer for SUSE Linux Enterprise since SLE 16.0, replacing the YaST Installer. Agama handles hard disk partitioning and system setup.

Cockpit

Cockpit is the configuration tool for SUSE Linux Enterprise since SLE 16.0, replacing the YaST Control Center. Cockpit handles online updates, network and firewall configuration, SELinux configuration, and user administration.

Myrlyn

Myrlyn is the software manager for SUSE Linux Enterprise since SLE 16.0, replacing the YaST Software. Myrlyn handles RPM package management and online updates.

SUSE Linux Enterprise administrative tools since SLE 16.0
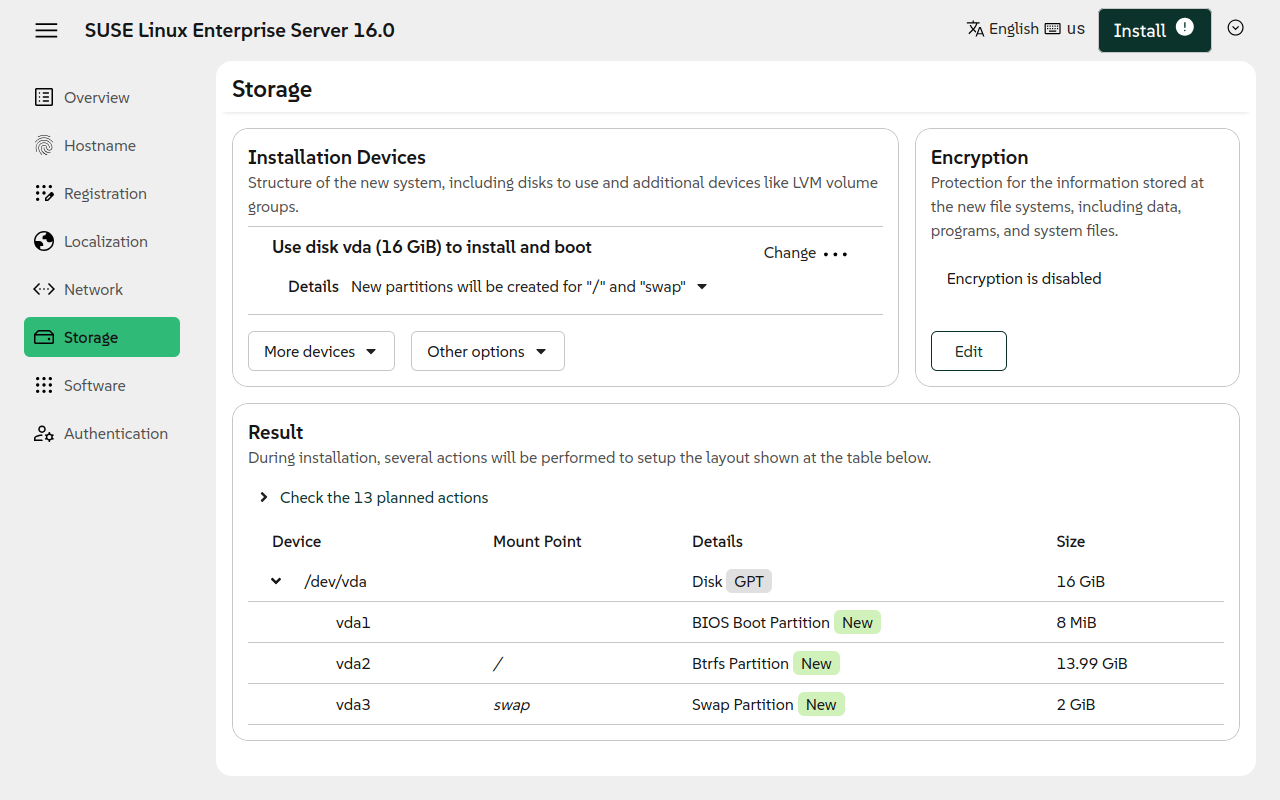
Agama

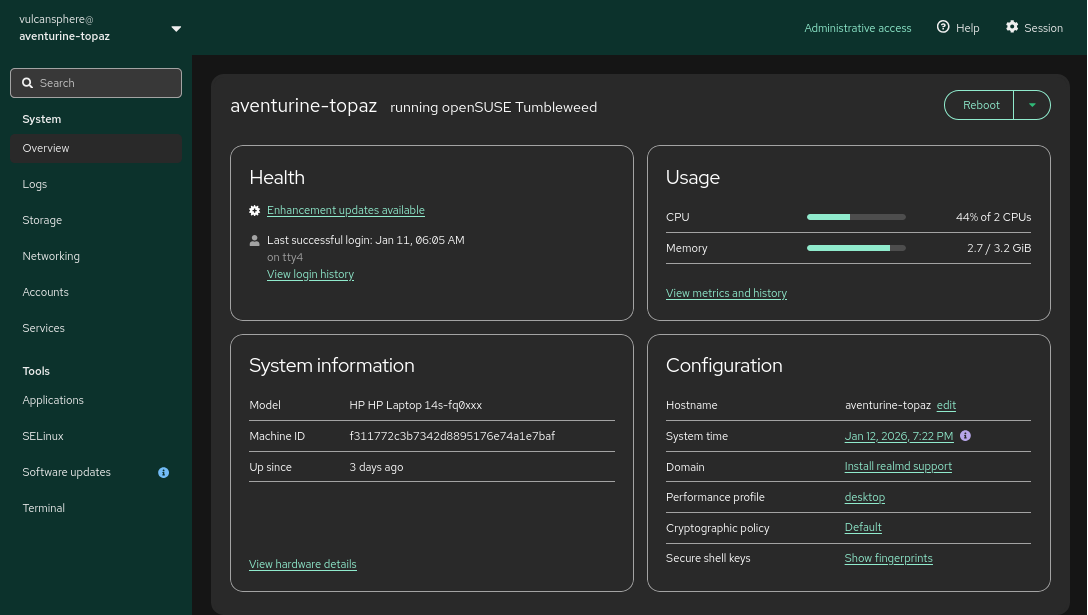
Cockpit

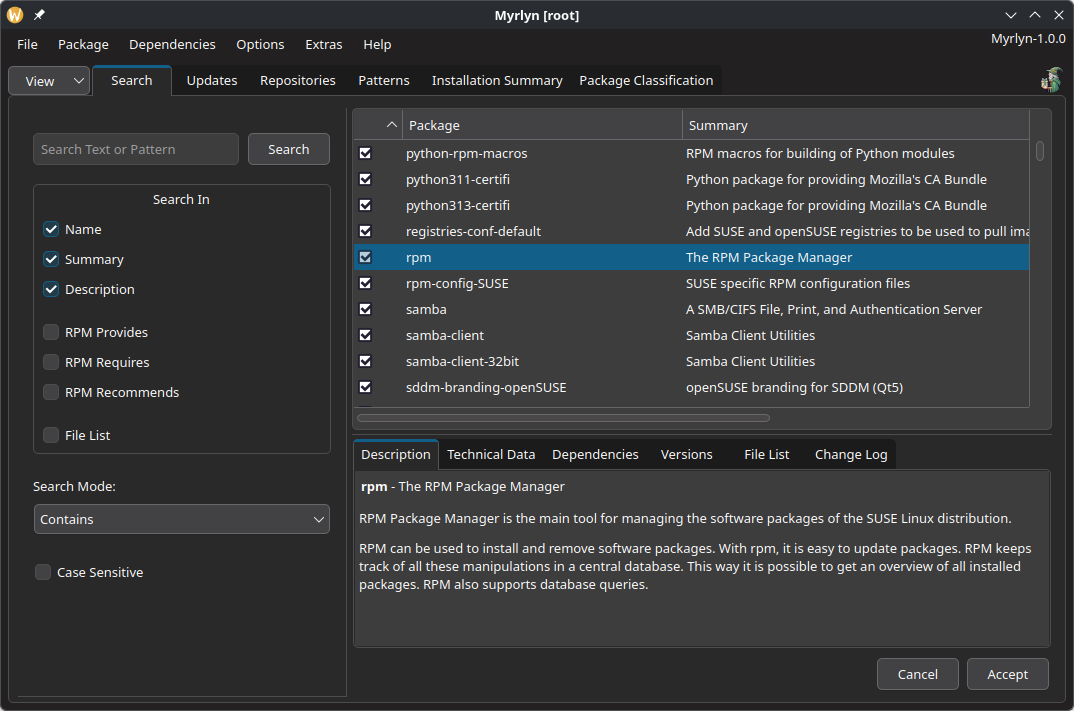
Myrlyn

YaST Control Center

YaST is the configuration tool in the SUSE Linux distributions, up to and including SLE 15. YaST is an installation and administration program which can handle hard disk partitioning, system setup, RPM package management, online updates, network and firewall configuration, user administration and more in an integrated interface consisting of various modules for each administrative task.

YaST's user interfaces
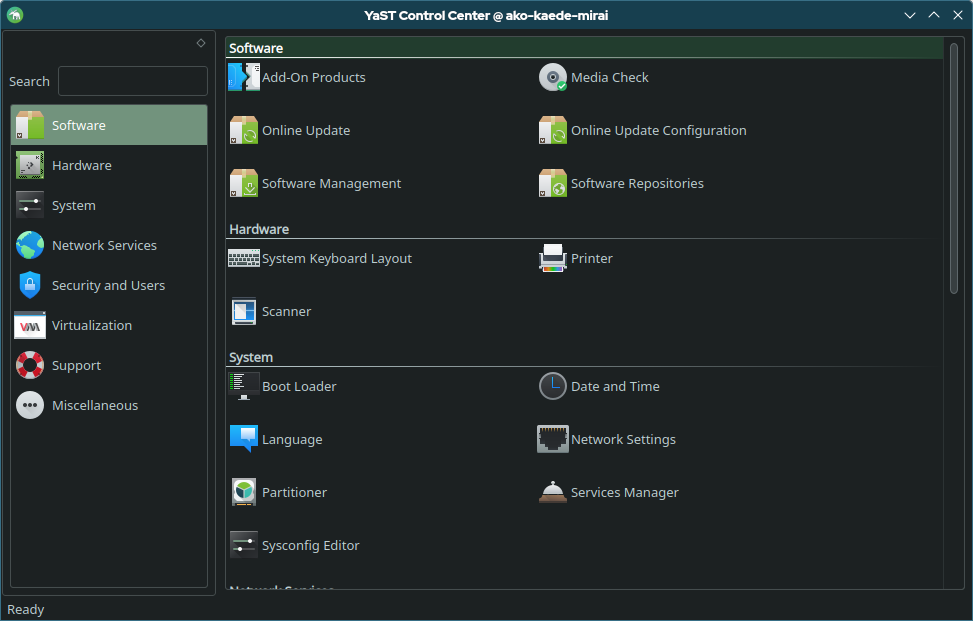
Graphical user interface

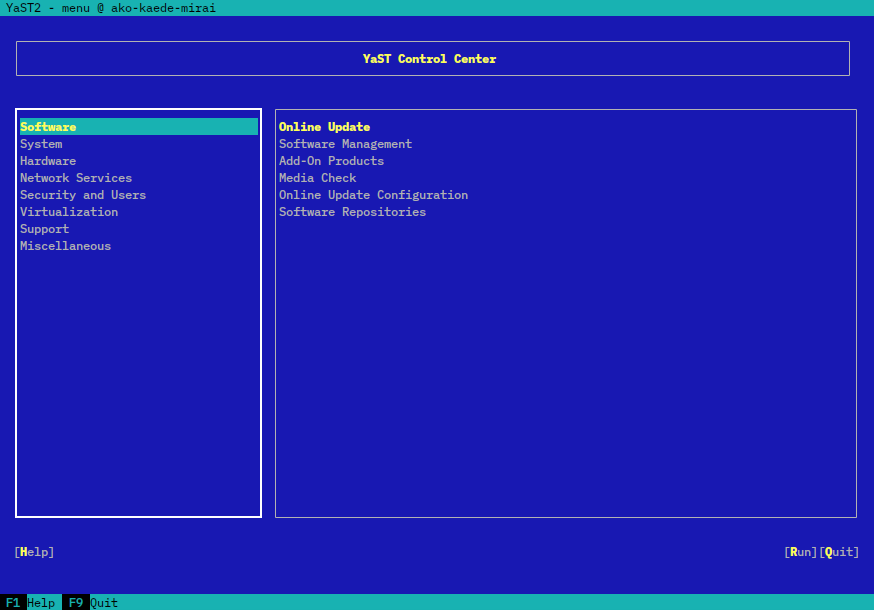
Text mode user interface

SUSE Package Hub

SUSE Package Hub gives SLE users the option to install packages that are not an official part of the SUSE Linux Enterprise distribution or are more up to date than those included with the latest version of SLE. SUSE Package Hub is unofficial, and the software installed from its repositories does not receive commercial support from SUSE. Currently about 9,000 packages are available from SUSE Package Hub for SLE 12 and 15 with packages available for AArch64, ppc64le, s390x, and x86-64.

== End-of-support schedule ==
Legacy versions of SUSE Linux Enterprise (SLES 9 and 10) had a ten year product lifecycle. Newer versions have a thirteen year product lifecycle (SLES 11, 12, and 15). The current support model consists of 10 years of general support from time of First Customer Shipment (FCS), followed by 3 years of Long Term Service Pack Support (LTSS), and 3 years more of LTSS Core.

SLES 16 changed Service Pack to Minor Release and Long Term Service Pack Support to Long Term Support (LTS).

| SLES version | Latest SP / Minor Release | FCS Release date | General Ends | LTSS/LTS Ends | LTSS/LTS Core Ends |
|---|---|---|---|---|---|
| first | —N/a | 31 October 2000 | ? | —N/a | —N/a |
| 7 | —N/a | 13 October 2001 | ? | —N/a | —N/a |
| 8 | 4 | 1 October 2002 | 30 December 2007 | 30 December 2009 | —N/a |
| 9 | 4 | 3 August 2004 | 31 August 2011 | 1 August 2014 | —N/a |
| 10 | 4 | 17 June 2006 | 31 July 2013 | 30 July 2016 | —N/a |
| 11 | 4 | 24 March 2009 | 31 March 2019 | 31 March 2022 | 31 March 2028 |
| 12 | 5 | 27 October 2014 | 31 October 2024 | 31 October 2027 | 1 October 2030 |
| 15 | 7 | 16 July 2018 | 31 July 2031 | 31 July 2034 | 1 December 2037 |
| 16 | 1 | 4 November 2025 | 30 November 2035 | 30 November 2038 | 30 November 2041 |
Unsupported Supported Latest version

== Version history ==
Release dates of SUSE Linux Enterprise Server versions:

| SUSE Linux Enterprise Server Version | Revision | Release date | Notes |
|---|---|---|---|
| first | S/390 | 31 October 2000 | |
| first | SPARC and IA-32 | April 2001 | |
| 7 | Initial release | 13 October 2001 | For the first time, a common codebase is used for all architectures (IA-32, Itanium, iSeries and pSeries, S/390 and zSeries 31-bit, zSeries 64-bit) |
| 8 | Initial release | October 2002 | |
| 8 | SP1 | | |
| 8 | SP2 | | |
| 8 | SP2a | | |
| 8 | SP3 | | |
| 8 | SP4 | | |
| 9 | Initial release | 3 August 2004 | |
| 9 | SP1 | 19 January 2005 | |
| 9 | SP2 | 7 July 2005 | |
| 9 | SP3 | 22 December 2005 | |
| 9 | SP4 | 12 December 2007 | |
| 10 | Initial release | 17 June 2006 | |
| 10 | SP1 | 18 June 2007 | |
| 10 | SP2 | 19 May 2008 | |
| 10 | SP3 | 12 October 2009 | |
| 10 | SP4 | 12 April 2011 | |
| 11 | Initial release | 24 March 2009 | |
| 11 | SP1 | 2 June 2010 | |
| 11 | SP2 | 15 February 2012 | |
| 11 | SP3 | 1 July 2013 | |
| 11 | SP4 | 16 July 2015 | |
| 12 | Initial release | 27 October 2014 | |
| 12 | SP1 | 15 December 2015 | |
| 12 | SP2 | 11 November 2016 | |
| 12 | SP3 | 7 September 2017 | |
| 12 | SP4 | 11 December 2018 | |
| 12 | SP5 | 9 December 2019 | |
| 15 | Initial release | 16 July 2018 | Versions 13 and 14 did not have server releases |
| 15 | SP1 | 24 June 2019 | |
| 15 | SP2 | 21 July 2020 | |
| 15 | SP3 | 23 June 2021 | |
| 15 | SP4 | 24 June 2022 | |
| 15 | SP5 | 20 June 2023 | |
| 15 | SP6 | 26 June 2024 | |
| 15 | SP7 | 24 June 2025 | |
| 16 | Initial release | 4 November 2025 | |
| 16 | 1 | 10 November 2026 | |

== See also ==
- Open Enterprise Server
- Linux on PowerPC
- Linux on IBM Z
- List of Linux distributions
- Comparison of Linux distributions
- Red Hat Enterprise Linux
