= KIWI (openSUSE) =

Operating system image and appliance builder

- Original author: SUSE
- Developer: openSUSE Project
- Stable release: 10.2.34
- Written in: Python
- Operating system: Linux
- Platform: Unix
- License: GPL-3.0 license
- Website: osinside.github.io/kiwi/
- Repository: github.com/OSInside/kiwi

KIWI is an application for making a wide variety of image sets for Linux supported hardware platforms as well as virtualization systems including QEMU, Xen and VMware.

It is developed by the openSUSE Project and used to create openSUSE Linux distribution, but can also be employed to build a variety of other Linux distributions.

== Usage and documentation ==
KIWI has a large amount of documentation available, organized in 'cook books' which guide new users through the process of creating increasingly complicated KIWI images.

Basic usage requires the installation of a number of tools besides KIWI, most notably for virtualization. KIWI is a command line tool and has no graphical user interface.

== KIWI in use ==
KIWI is used by a variety of organizations in a variety of places. Besides SUSE Linux and the openSUSE Project, IBM has a product using KIWI and Dell employs it as well.

=== SUSE Studio ===
SUSE Studio is a web interface (Ruby on Rails) to KIWI and the Open Build Service. It allows users to graphically put together a custom Linux OS and generate output including a large variety of virtual machine and disk images.

== See also ==
- Boot image
- ROM image
