= SUSE linux =

#REDIRECT OpenSUSE

- From other capitalisation: This is a redirect from a title with another method of capitalisation. It leads to the title in accordance with the Wikipedia naming conventions for capitalisation, or it leads to a title that is associated in some way with the conventional capitalisation of this redirect title. This may help writing, searching and international language issues.
  - If this redirect is an incorrect capitalisation, then {{R from miscapitalisation}} should be used instead, and pages that use this link should be updated to link directly to the target. Miscapitalisations can be tagged in any namespace.
  - Use this rcat to tag only mainspace redirects; when other capitalisations are in other namespaces, use {{R from modification}} instead.
