= Open Build Service =

Development platform for Linux distributions

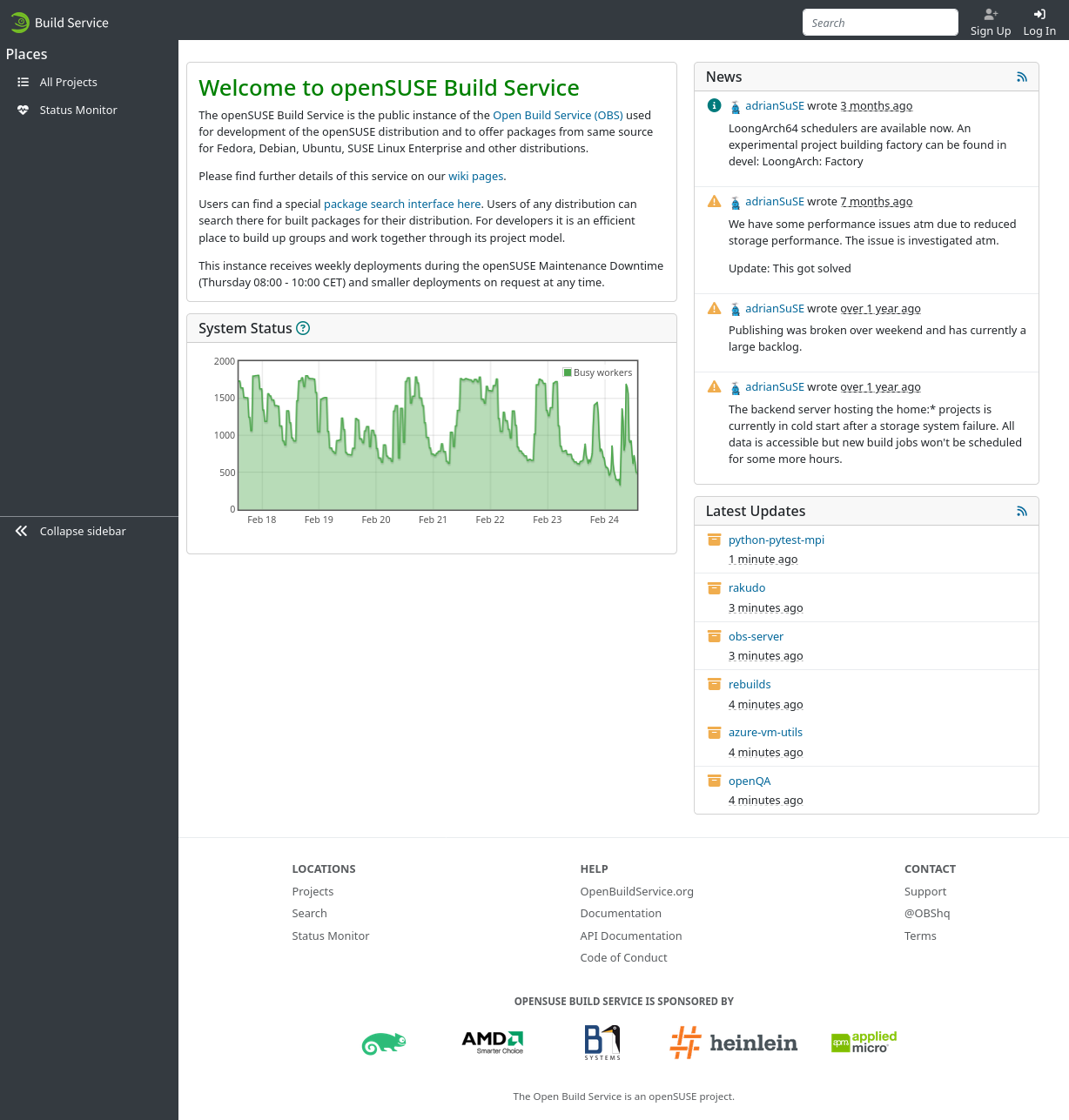
- Screenshot
- Original author: SUSE
- Developers: openSUSE Project, Linux Foundation
- Stable release: 2.10.21 / April 10, 2023; 2 years ago
- Repository: github.com/openSUSE/open-build-service
- Written in: Ruby, Perl
- Operating system: Linux
- Type: Web service, cross compiler
- License: GPLv2-only
- Website: openbuildservice.org

The Open Build Service (formerly called openSUSE Build Service) is an open and complete distribution development platform designed to encourage developers to compile packages for multiple Linux distributions including SUSE Linux Enterprise Server, openSUSE, Red Hat Enterprise Linux, Mandriva, Ubuntu, Fedora, Debian, and Arch Linux. It typically simplifies the packaging process, so developers can more easily package a single program for many distributions, and many openSUSE releases, making more packages available to users regardless of what distribution they use. Also, product and appliance building is supported by OBS.

The Build Service software is published under the GPL. In an acknowledgement of its usefulness to the wider Linux community, the Linux Foundation has announced that the project will be added to the Linux Developer Network (LDN). Also, various companies, MeeGo project and Tizen are using it for developing their distribution. Nokia Meltemi project was also built using OBS.

It also delivers a collaboration environment, allowing developer groups to build and submit changes to other projects.

== Workflow and usage ==
One can either run the Open Build Service as a private installation, or utilize public instances such as the openSUSE Build Service located at build.opensuse.org, hosted by SUSE. The latter offers up to 400 build slots, but external services may impose limitations as to what packages are allowed to be hosted, so private installations are usually chosen when proprietary or legally problematic software is to be hosted.

Each packager has a "home" project by default where they can upload sources and definitions on how to build RPM or Debian packages. Commits outside the home space is possible given permissions have been granted to a developer. After each upload, the Build Service schedules the changed packages to be rebuilt. On completion, the resulting binary packages are published instantaneously to the download server, which makes them available to the public.

The Build Service provides a public API which is implemented in several user interfaces:

- a web interface at build.opensuse.org
- a command line interface called osc

Furthermore, a plug-in for integrating the Build Service into Eclipse is developed as a Google Summer of Code project, as well as a plugin for Qt Creator.

Instances can be linked, such that sources and packages from a remote host can be reused, thereby eliminating the need to bootstrap/import dependencies manually for preexisting projects.

== See also ==
- openSUSE
- mer
