= OpenSUSE =

Community-supported Linux distribution

openSUSE

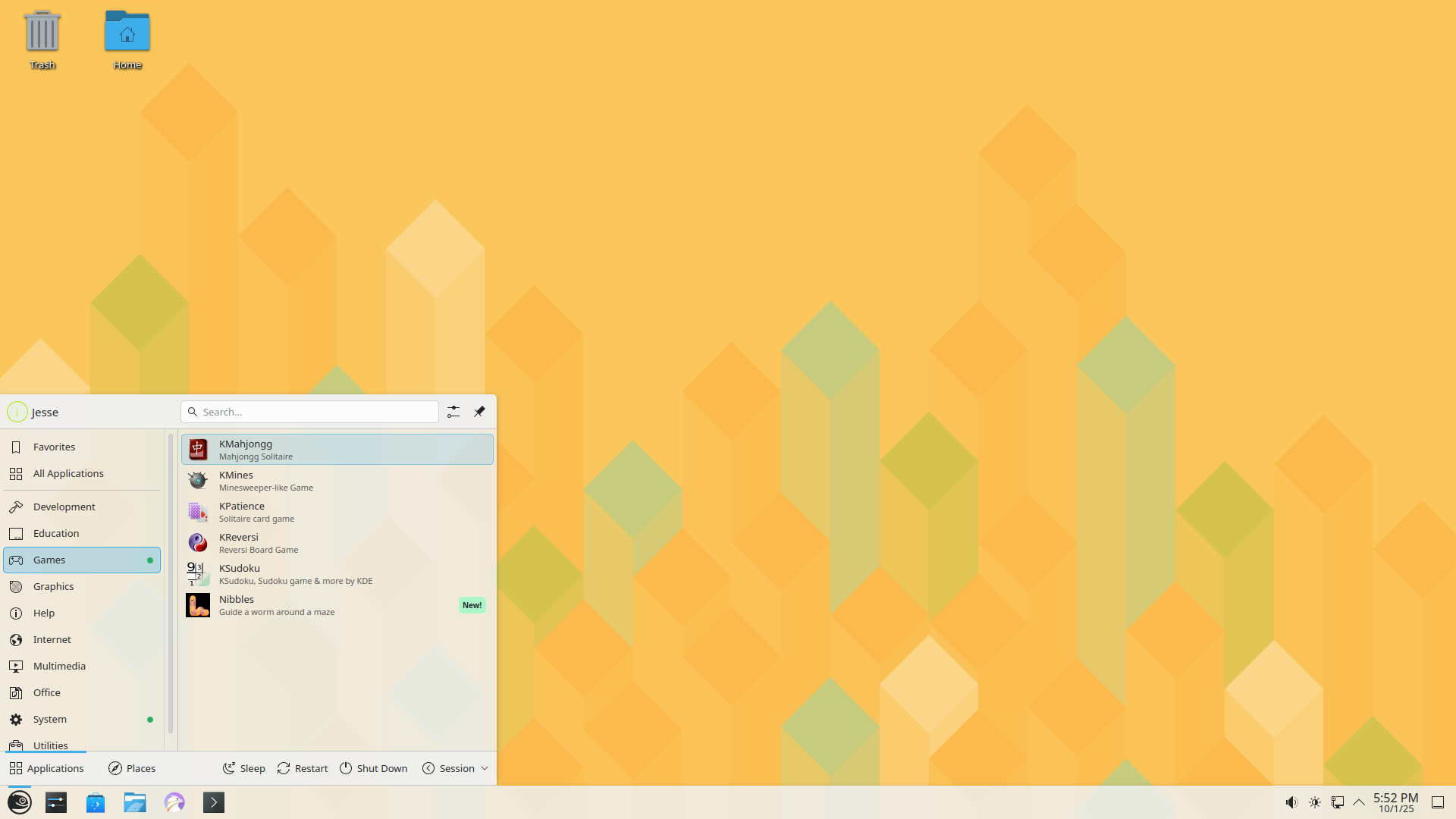
- openSUSE Leap 16.0 with default KDE Plasma configuration
- Developer: openSUSE Project
- OS family: Unix-like: Linux
- Working state: Current
- Source model: Open source
- Initial release: March 1994; 32 years ago (as SUSE Linux); 7 December 2006; 19 years ago (as openSUSE)
- Latest release: openSUSE Leap: 16.1 / 3 November 2026; 15 days ago
- Repository: build.opensuse.org
- Marketing target: Desktops, workstations, servers, development
- Available in: English, German, Russian, Italian, Portuguese, many others
- Update method: Rolling release (Tumbleweed); ~ 1 year per fixed release (Leap)
- Package manager: ZYpp (standard); YaST (GUI or curses front-end); Zypper (command-line front-end); RPM (low-level)
- Supported platforms: IA-32 (Tumbleweed); x86-64; ARM (aarch64, armv6hl, armv7hl); S390, IBM Z; RISC-V; PowerPC (PPC64, PPC64le)
- Kernel type: Monolithic: Linux
- Userland: GNU
- Default user interface: Default: KDE Plasma, GNOME, XFCE; Optional: Enlightenment, LXDE, LXQt, MATE
- License: Free software licenses (mainly GNU GPL)
- Official website: www.opensuse.org

openSUSE ( /ˌoʊpənˈsuːzə/) is a free and open-source Linux distribution developed by the openSUSE Project. It is offered in two main variations: Tumbleweed, an upstream rolling release distribution, and Leap, a stable release distribution which is sourced from SUSE Linux Enterprise.

The openSUSE project is sponsored by SUSE of Germany. The company released the first version as SUSE Linux in 1994. Its development was opened up to the community in 2005, which marked the creation of openSUSE. The focus of the developers is on creating a stable and user-friendly RPM-based operating system with a large target group for workstations and servers.

Additionally, the project creates a variety of related tools, such as Agama, Myrlyn, YaST, Open Build Service, openQA, Snapper, Portus, KIWI, and OSEM.

== Product history ==
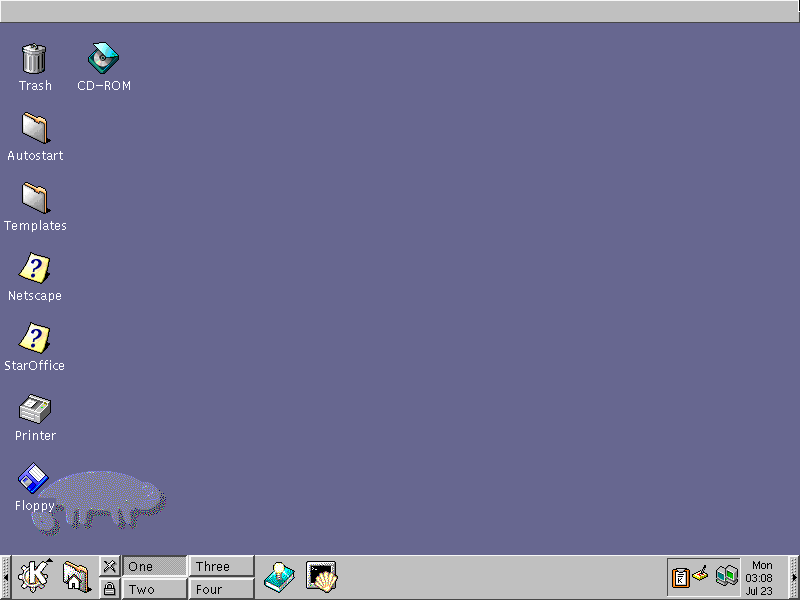
SuSE Linux 7.1, released 24 January 2001, with KDE 1.1.2 desktop

=== SUSE Linux ===
In the past, the SUSE Linux company has focused on releasing the SUSE Linux Personal and SUSE Linux Professional box sets which included extensive printed documentation that was available for sale in retail stores. The company's ability to sell an open-source product was largely due to the closed-source development process used. Although SUSE Linux had always been a free software product licensed with the GNU General Public License (GNU GPL), it was only freely possible to retrieve the source code of the next release 2 months after it was ready for purchase. SUSE Linux's strategy was to create a technically superior Linux distribution with a large number of employed engineers, that would make users willing to pay for their distribution in retail stores.

SUSE Linux is of German origin, its name being an acronym of "Software und System-Entwicklung" (software and systems development), and it was mainly developed in Europe. The first version appeared in early 1994, making SUSE one of the oldest existing commercial distributions. It is known for its YaST configuration tool.

=== openSUSE ===
Since the acquisition by Novell in 2004 and with the advent of openSUSE, this has been reversed: starting with version 9.2, an unsupported one-DVD ISO image of SUSE Professional was made available for download. The FTP server continues to operate and has the advantage of "streamlined" installs, allowing the user to download only the packages the user feels they need. The ISO has the advantages of an easy install package, the ability to operate even if the user's network card does not work "out of the box", and less experience needed (i.e., an inexperienced Linux user may not know whether or not to install a certain package, and the ISO offers several preselected sets of packages).

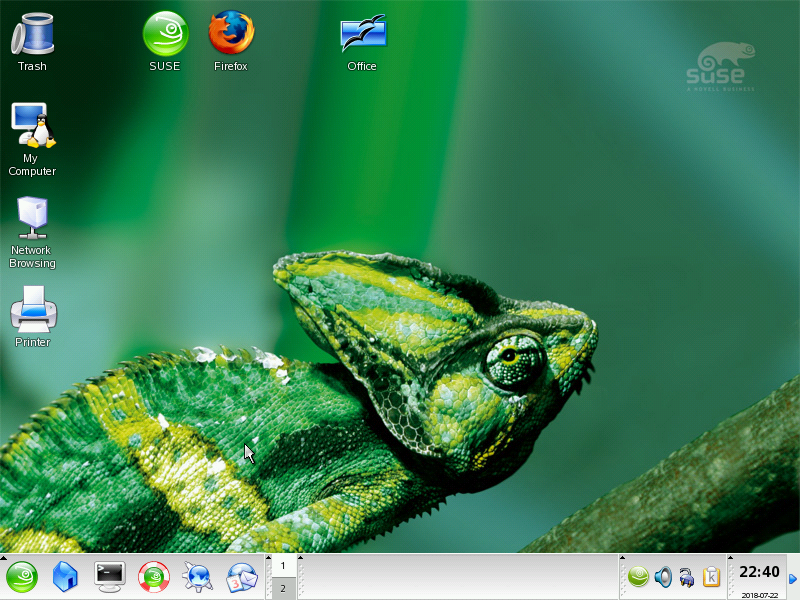
SUSE Linux 10.0, released 6 October 2005, was the first release of the openSUSE Project

The initial stable release from the openSUSE Project, SUSE Linux 10.0, was available for download just before the retail release of SUSE Linux 10.0. In addition, Novell discontinued the Personal version, renaming the Professional version to simply "SUSE Linux," and repricing "SUSE Linux" to about the same as the old Personal version. In 2006, with version 10.2, the SUSE Linux distribution was officially renamed to openSUSE, as it is pronounced similarly to "open source". Until version 13.2, stable fixed releases with separate maintenance streams from SLE (SUSE Linux Enterprise) were the project's main offering. Since late 2015, openSUSE has been split into two main offerings, Leap, the more conservative fixed release Leap distribution based on SLE, and Tumbleweed, the rolling release distribution focused on integrating the latest stable packages from upstream projects.

Over the years, SUSE Linux has gone from a status of a distribution with restrictive, delayed publications (2 months of waiting for those who had not bought the box, without ISOs available, but installation available via FTP) and a closed development model to a free distribution model with immediate and free availability for all and transparent and open development.

On 27 April 2011, Attachmate completed its acquisition of Novell. Attachmate split Novell into two autonomous business units, Novell and SUSE. Attachmate made no changes to the relationship between SUSE (formerly Novell) and the openSUSE project. After the 2014 merger of the Attachmate Group with Micro Focus, SUSE reaffirmed its commitment to openSUSE.

EQT AB announced their intent to acquire SUSE on 2 July 2018. There were no expected changes in the relationship between SUSE and openSUSE. This acquisition was the third acquisition of SUSE Linux since the founding of the openSUSE Project and closed on 15 March 2019.

== The openSUSE Project ==
The openSUSE Project
- Founder: Novell
- Type: Community
- Purpose: Free software
- Products: openSUSE distribution, Open Build Service, openQA etc.
- Website: en.opensuse.org/Portal:Project

The openSUSE Project is a community project to create, promote, improve, and document the openSUSE Linux distribution.

The openSUSE Project community, sponsored by SUSE and others, develops and maintains various distributions based on Linux.

Beyond the distributions and tools, the openSUSE Project provides a web portal for community involvement. The community develops openSUSE collaboratively with its corporate sponsors through the Open Build Service, openQA, writing documentation, designing artwork, fostering discussions on open mailing lists and in Internet Relay Chat channels, and improving the openSUSE site through its wiki interface.

The openSUSE Project develops free software and tools and has two main Linux distributions named openSUSE Leap and openSUSE Tumbleweed. The project has several distributions for specific purposes like MicroOS, which is an immutable operating system that hosts container workloads, and the Kubernetes certified distribution Kubic, which is a multi-purpose standalone and Kubernetes container operating system based on openSUSE MicroOS. The project is sponsored by a number of companies and individuals, most notably SUSE, AMD, B1 Systems, Heinlein Support, and TUXEDO Computers.

The first indication that there should be a community-based Linux distribution called OpenSuSE goes back to an email of 3 August 2005, in which at the same time the launch of the website opensuse.org was announced. This page was available a few days later. One day later the launch of the community project was officially announced.

According to its own understanding, openSUSE is a community that propagates the use of Linux and free software wherever possible. Besides a Linux-based distribution, it develops tools like the Open Build Service and YaST. Collaboration is open to everyone.

=== Activities ===
The openSUSE Project develops the openSUSE Linux distribution as well as a large number of tools around building Linux distributions like the Open Build Service, KIWI, YaST, openQA, Snapper, Portus, and more. The project annually hosts free software events. The community's conference is held at a location in Europe and a summit is held at a location in Asia.

=== Organization ===
The project is controlled by its community and relies on the contributions of individuals, working as testers, writers, translators, usability experts, artists, and developers. The project embraces a wide variety of technology, people with different levels of expertise, speaking different languages, and having different cultural backgrounds.

There is an openSUSE Board which is responsible for leading the overall project. The openSUSE Board provides guidance and supports existing governance structures but does not direct or control development, since community mechanisms exist to accomplish the goals of the project. The board documents decisions and policies.

The project is self-organized without a legal structure, although the establishment of a foundation has been under consideration for some time.

SUSE as the main sponsor exerts some influence, but the project is legally independent of SUSE. openSUSE is a "do-ocracy" in which those who do the work also decide what happens. This is primarily the case with desktop and application development, as the sources of the base packages have been coming from SLE since the switch to the Leap development model. To further unify the base, the 'Closing-the-Leap-Gap' project has been started, where openSUSE Leap 15.3 will be completely based on SLE's binary packages.

=== Organizational units ===
There are three main organizational units:

- openSUSE Board: the board consists of 5 members elected for 2 years at a time, plus the chairman, who is provided by SUSE. The Board serves as a central point of contact, helps with conflict resolutions and communicates community interests to SUSE. As of February 2025, the Board has the following members:
  - Dr. Gerald Pfeifer (Austria), Chair
  - Ish Sookun (Mauritius)
  - Jeff Mahoney (United States)
  - Rachel Schrader (United States)
  - Shawn W Dunn (United States)
  - Simon Lees (Australia)
- Election Officials: The Election Committee manages and supervises the elections to the openSUSE Board. It consists of three or more volunteers.
- Membership-Officials: The Membership-Officials are appointed by the Board if interested. The Membership-Officials decide on the admission of contributors to the group of openSUSE members upon request. A member receives, among other things, an @opensuse.org address. Only members may vote in the election to the Board.

== Current distributions ==
=== openSUSE Tumbleweed ===
openSUSE Tumbleweed Logo

Tumbleweed is the flagship of the openSUSE Project. Instead of classical version numbers and periodic updates, a rolling release system is used: updates happen continuously; prior states of the operating system are saved as "snapshots". Tumbleweed is preferred by openSUSE users as a desktop computer system.

In the old development model, with each new openSUSE release (13.0, 13.1, ...), a new rolling release is set-up, which always receives new packages. When the new release is to occur, Tumbleweed is reset to that release, and most packages are newer than the ones in the release. This causes problems.

With the switch to Leap, the development model was changed greatly: according to the Factory First policy, all software packages must be sent to Factory before they can be included in a distribution. Out of Factory, a daily snapshot is taken and tested in openQA. A successful test is released as the next Tumbleweed snapshot. Unlike other rolling release distributions, Tumbleweed is a tested rolling release, which increases stability dramatically.

Technically, Tumbleweed is the basis for MicroOS and Kubic.

=== openSUSE Leap ===
openSUSE Leap Logo

Leap is a classic stable distribution approach: one release yearly, and in between, security updates and bug fixes. This makes Leap attractive for use in servers, and desktop computers, since it needs little maintenance effort.

For the version released in the fall of 2015, the development team settled on the name openSUSE Leap with the deviating version number 42.1. As in the openSUSE version 4.2 from May 1996, which was named S.u.S.E. Linux at the time, the number 42 refers to the question about "life, the universe and everything" in the Hitchhiker's Guide to the Galaxy book series. After that, the basis packages are received from the SUSE Linux Enterprise, while applications and desktops come from Tumbleweed.

At the openSUSE conference held in Nuremberg in 2016, statistics were announced that since the conceptual reorientation with openSUSE Leap 42.1, increasing user numbers had been recorded. According to this, the number of downloads is 400,000 DVD-images per month with an increasing tendency. Each month, 1,600 installations would be added, and 500,000 packages would be installed. The number of Tumbleweed users is 60,000, half of whom frequently perform updates. Thus, the number of Tumbleweed installations had doubled in the last year.

Other findings from the statistics are that most installations are done via DVD images. The dominant architecture is x86-64. The geographical distribution of users has hardly changed according to these figures. One-third of users are in Germany, 12% are in the US, 5% in Russia, and 3% in Brazil.

For the openSUSE Leap 15.3 release, the software repository for openSUSE Leap and SUSE Linux Enterprise (SLE) was merged and now contains the same source code and binary packages. SLE 15 will be supported until 31 July 2028.

=== openSUSE MicroOS ===
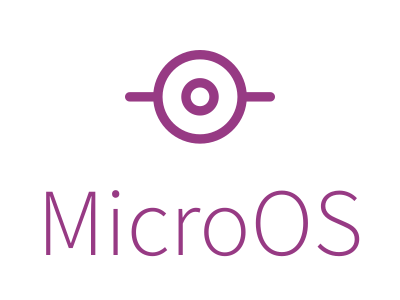
MicroOS Logo

MicroOS is an immutable, minimalist, self-maintained, and transactional system, which is mostly, but not exclusively, intended for use in edge computing or as container runtime. Some do use it as desktop system.

The system is self-contained and transactional; it updates itself in an all-or-nothing approach (transactional) and rolls back to its prior state in case something goes wrong. It runs from a read-only file system, preventing accidental changes and malware attacks. The transactional update does not affect the running system.

All software available for Tumbleweed is also available for MicroOS. As it comes with podman Container-Runtime, MicroOS is advertised as "the perfect Container-Host."

MicroOS Desktop was the focus for the 2021 Hackweek.

On 31 May 2023, openSUSE announced name changes: the GNOME version of MicroOS is now called Aeon, and the Plasma version is called Kalpa.

=== Factory project ===
The Factory project is the rolling development code base for openSUSE Tumbleweed, Factory is mainly used as an internal term for openSUSE's distribution developers, and the target project for all contributions to openSUSE's main code base. There is a constant flow of packages going into the Factory. There is no freeze; therefore, the Factory repository is not guaranteed to be fully stable and is not intended to be used by humans.

The core system packages receive automated testing via openQA. When automated testing is completed and the repository is in a consistent state, the repository is synced to the download mirrors and published as openSUSE Tumbleweed, That usually happens several times a week.

== Supported architectures ==
openSUSE currently (2024) supports installation via ISO and/or over a network from repositories for a wide range of hardware and virtualization platforms. This includes AArch64 (custom version for Raspberry Pi is available), Arm8, POWER8 (ppc64le), IBM zSystems (s390x), the ubiquitous Intel 64 (x86-64), i586, and i686. Arm8 (including earlier Raspberry Pi models), i586, and i686 are available in 32-bit version only. Specialized releases for use in containers and virtualized environments are available for onie, Microsoft Hyper-V, kvm, xen, Digital Ocean Cloud, Container Host with VMware, Vagrant, and VirtualBox. It can also be installed in conventional virtualization environments with a range of architectures e.g. using VirtualBox, VMWare, or Hyper-V.

openSUSE Leap currently supports: aarch64, ppc64le, s390x, x86_64.

== Features ==
=== Administrative tools ===
There are two suites of administrative tools used on openSUSE Leap and openSUSE Tumbleweed, one is the suite introduced with openSUSE Leap 16 (which can be installed on Tumbleweed as well) consisting of Agama (system installer), Cockpit (configuration tool), and Myrlyn (package management) and another one is YaST used with openSUSE Leap 15, alongside existing Tumbleweed installations.

==== Agama ====
Agama is the system installer for openSUSE Leap since openSUSE Leap 16, replacing the YaST Installer. Agama handles hard disk partitioning and system setup.

==== Cockpit ====
Cockpit is the configuration tool for openSUSE Leap since openSUSE Leap 16, replacing the YaST Control Center. Cockpit handles online updates, network and firewall configuration, SELinux configuration, and user administration.

==== Myrlyn ====
Myrlyn is the software manager for openSUSE Leap since openSUSE Leap 16, replacing the YaST Software. Myrlyn handles RPM package management and online updates.

openSUSE administrative tools since openSUSE Leap 16
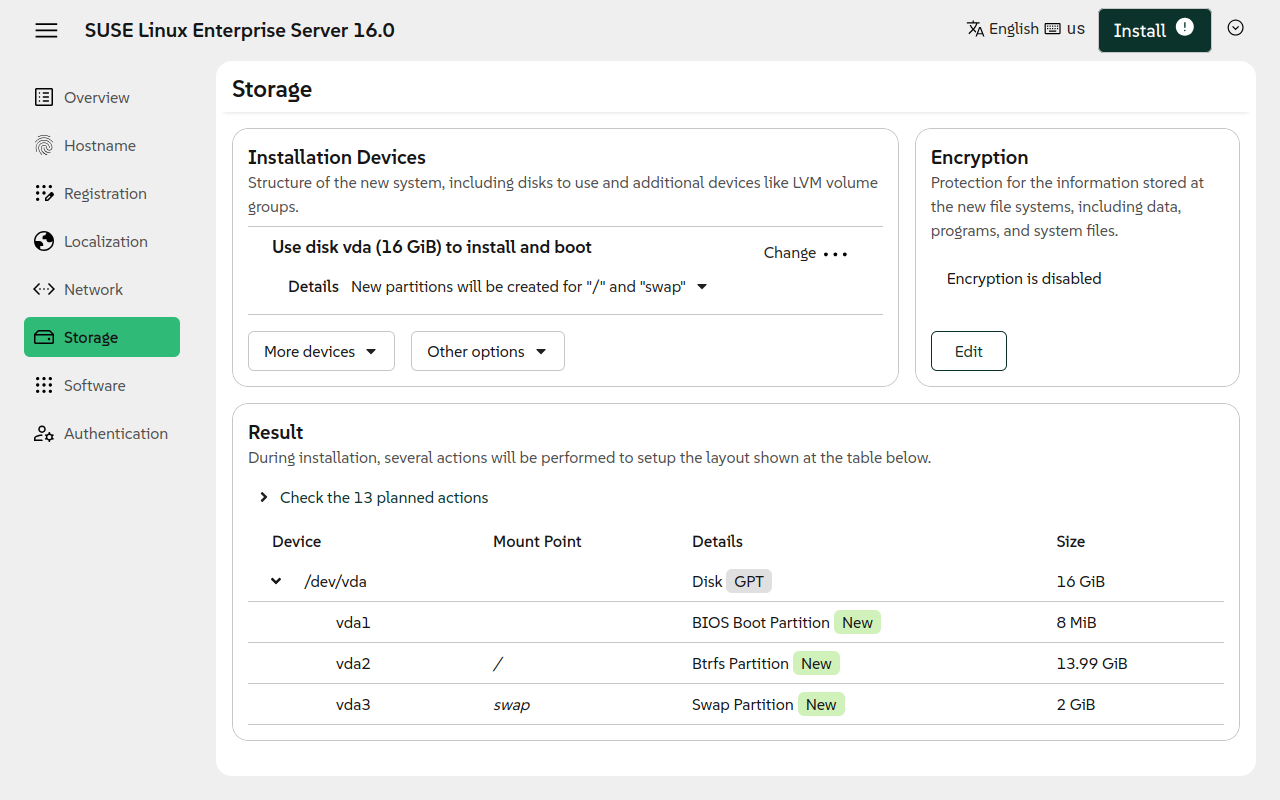
Agama

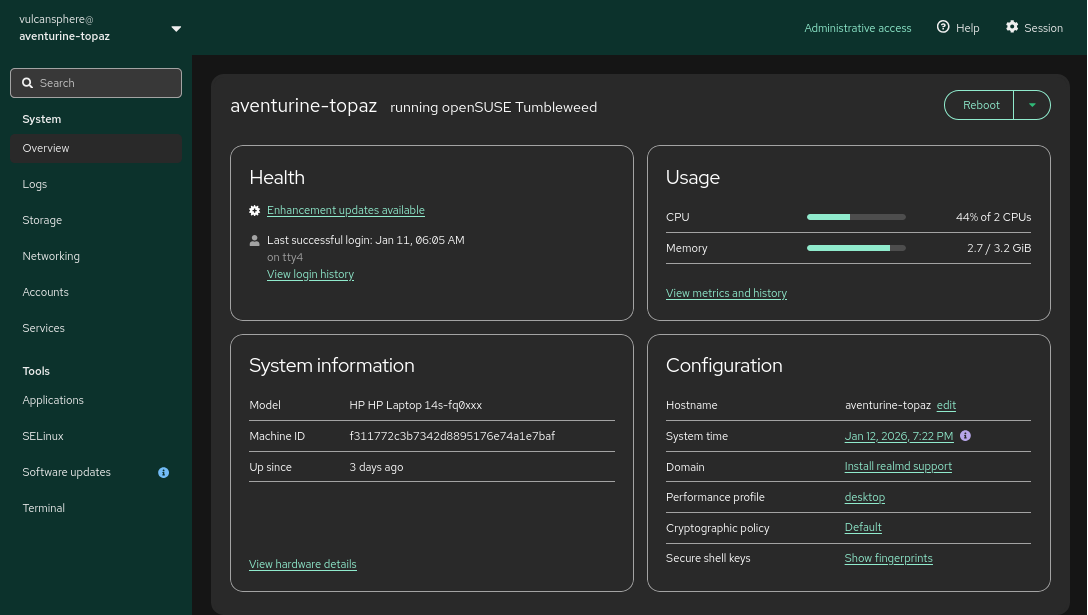
Cockpit

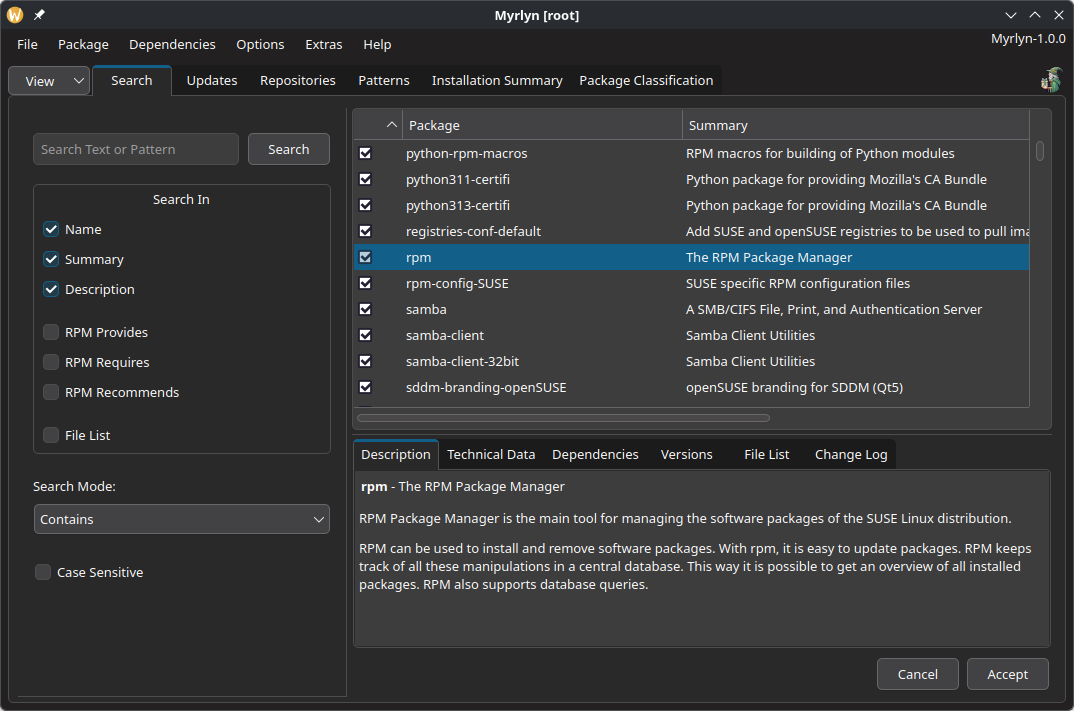
Myrlyn

==== YaST Control Center ====
SUSE includes an installation and administration program called YaST ("Yet another Setup Tool") which handles hard disk partitioning, system setup, RPM package management, online updates, network, and firewall configuration, user administration and more in an integrated interface. By 2010, many more YaST modules were added, including one for Bluetooth support. It also controls all software applications. SaX2 was once integrated into YaST to change monitor settings, however, with openSUSE 11.3 SaX2 has been removed.

The GTK user interface was removed starting with Leap 42.1, however, the ncurses and Qt interfaces remain.

YaST was deprecated starting with Leap 16 with the Qt interface removed, however, the ncurses interface is still available to download and use.

YaST's user interfaces
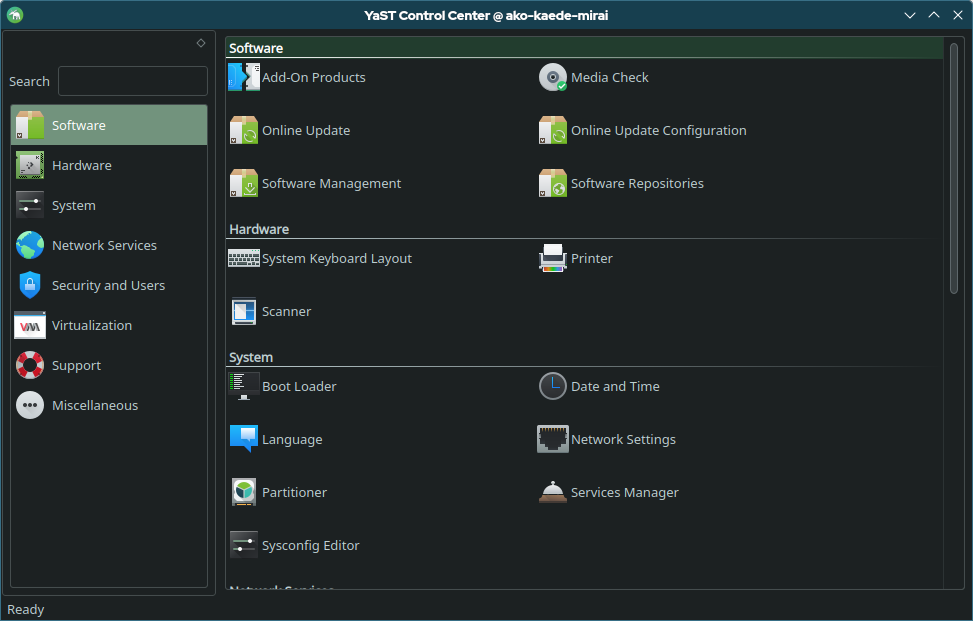
Qt

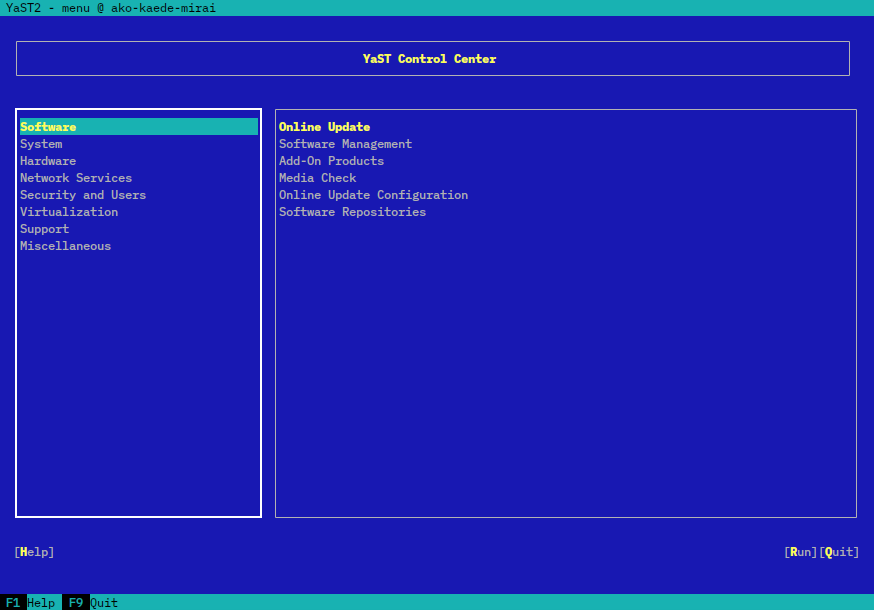
ncurses

==== AutoYaST ====
AutoYaST is part of YaST2 and is used for automatic installation. The configuration is stored in an XML file and the installation happens without user interaction.

==== WebYaST ====
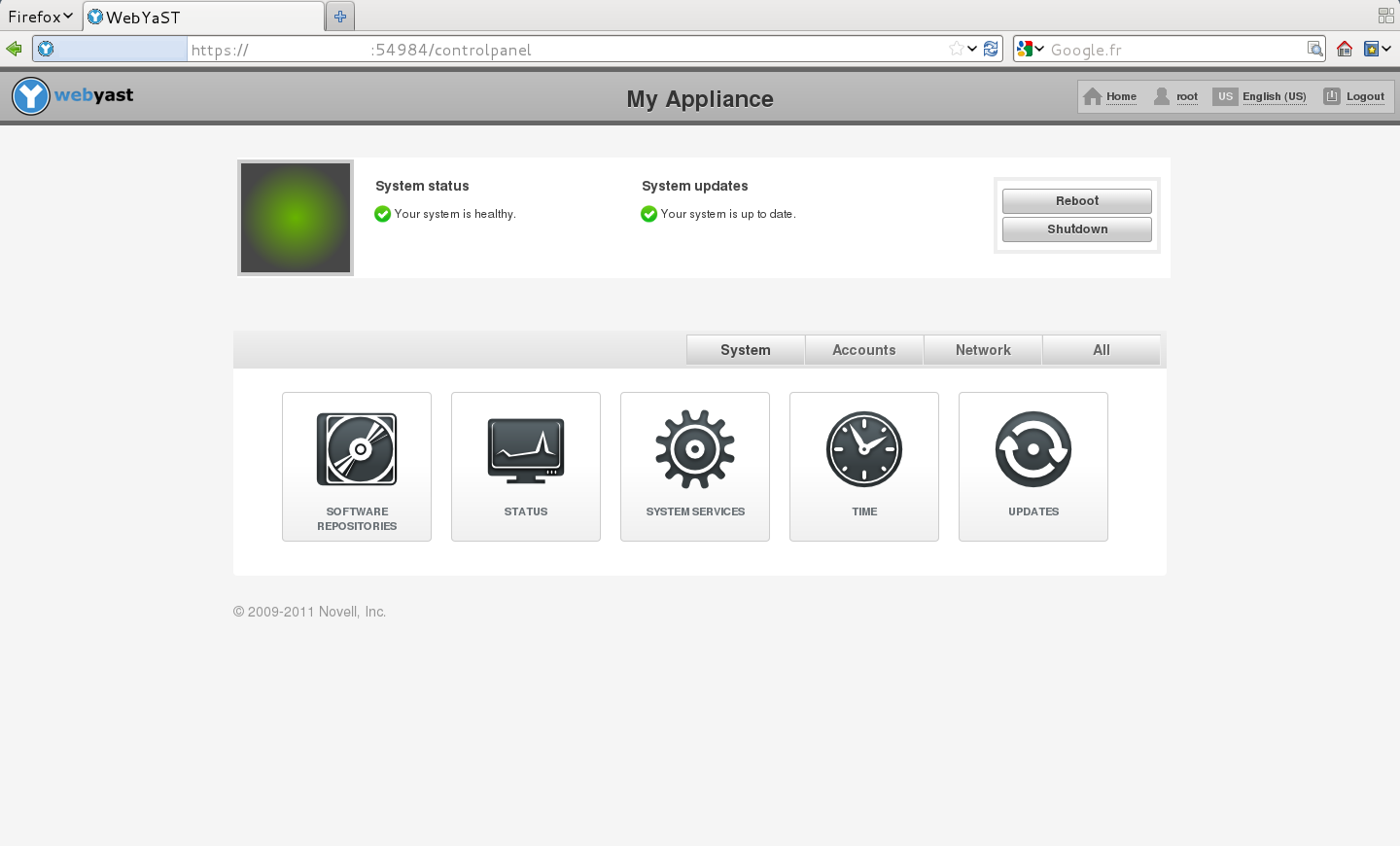
WebYaST

WebYaST is a web interface version of YaST. It can configure settings and updates of the openSUSE machine it is running on. It can also shut down and check the status of the host.

==== ZYpp package management ====
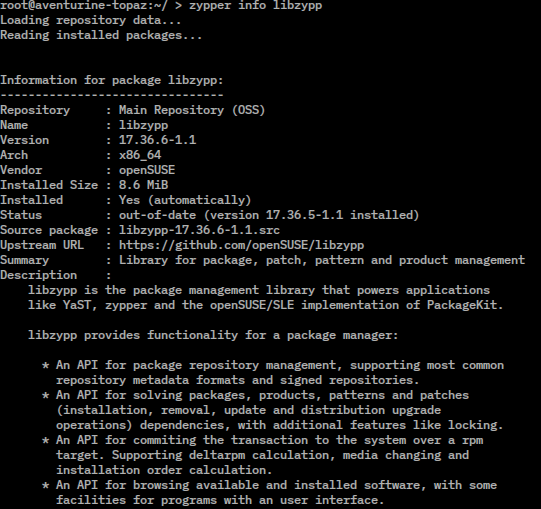
Screenshot of zypper, part of ZYpp

ZYpp (or libzypp) is a Linux software management engine. ZYpp is the backend for zypper, the default command line package management tool for openSUSE.

==== Build Service ====
The Open Build Service provides software developers with a tool to compile, release and publish their software for many distributions, including Mandriva, Ubuntu, Fedora and Debian. It typically simplifies the packaging process, so developers can more easily package a single program for many distributions, and many openSUSE releases, making more packages available to users regardless of what distribution version they use. It is published under the GNU GPLv2+.

==== Default use of Delta RPM ====
By default, openSUSE uses Delta RPMs when updating an installation. A Delta RPM contains the difference between an old and a new version of a package. This means that only the changes between the installed package and the new one, are downloaded. This reduces bandwidth consumption and update time, which is especially important on slow Internet connections.

=== Desktop innovation ===
==== KDE ====
SUSE was a leading contributor to the KDE project for many years. SUSE's contributions in this area have been very wide-ranging, and affecting many parts of KDE such as kdelibs and KDEBase, Kontact, and kdenetwork. Other notable projects include: KNetworkManager – a front-end to NetworkManager and Kickoff – a new K menu for KDE Plasma Desktop.

From openSUSE Leap 42.1 to 15.0, the default Plasma 5 desktop for openSUSE used the traditional cascading Application Menu in place of the upstream default Kickoff-like Application Launcher menu. The openSUSE Leap KDE experience is built on long-term support versions of KDE Plasma, starting with openSUSE Leap 42.2. With openSUSE Leap 15.1, the Plasma 5 desktop now again defaults to the Kickoff-style application menu.

==== GNOME ====
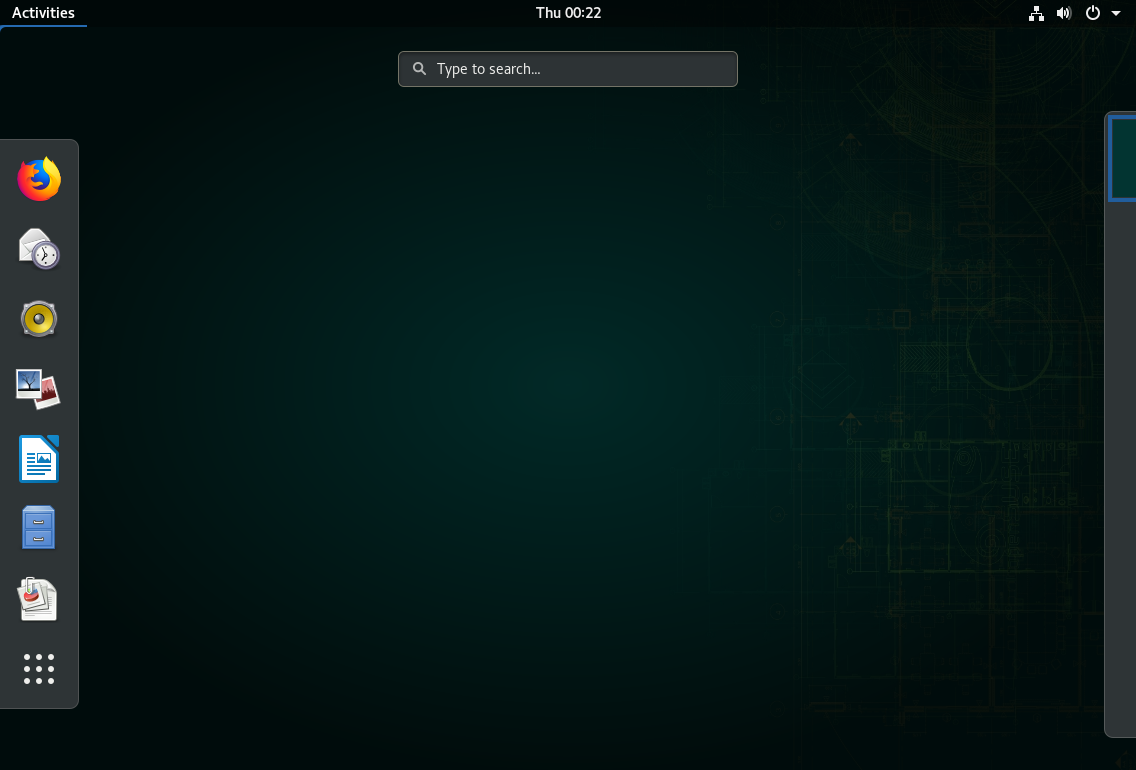
GNOME 3.26 under openSUSE 15.1. openSUSE Leap's GNOME implementation has used Wayland by default since version 15.0

The Ximian group became part of Novell, and in turn made and continued several contributions to GNOME with applications such as F-Spot, Evolution and Banshee. The GNOME desktop used the slab instead of the classic double-panelled GNOME menu bars from openSUSE 10.2 to openSUSE 11.4. In openSUSE 12.1 slab was replaced with the upstream GNOME Shell and GNOME Fallback designs.

Starting with openSUSE Leap 15.0, GNOME on Wayland is offered as the default GNOME session. GNOME Classic, GNOME on Xorg, and "GNOME SLE" are offered as alternative sessions to the more upstream Wayland-based session.

== Releases ==
=== 10.x series ===
The initial stable release from the openSUSE Project was SUSE Linux 10.0, released on 6 October 2005. This was released as a freely downloadable ISO image and as a boxed retail package, with certain bundled software only included in the retail package.

On 11 May 2006, the openSUSE Project released SUSE Linux 10.1, with the mailing list announcement identifying Xgl, NetworkManager, AppArmor and Xen as prominent features.

For their third release, the openSUSE Project renamed their distribution, releasing openSUSE 10.2 on 7 December 2006. Several areas that developers focused their efforts on were reworking the menus used to launch programs in KDE and GNOME, moving to ext3 as the default file system, providing support for internal readers of Secure Digital cards commonly used in digital cameras, improving power management framework (more computers can enter suspended states instead of shutting down and starting up) and the package management system. This release also featured version 2.0 of Mozilla Firefox.

The fourth release, openSUSE 10.3, was made available as a stable version on 4 October 2007. An overhaul of the software package management system (including support for 1-Click-Install), legal MP3 support from Fluendo and improved boot-time are some of the areas focused on for this release.

=== 11.x series ===
openSUSE 11.0 was released on 19 June 2008. It includes the latest version of GNOME and two versions of KDE (the older, stable 3.5.9 and the newer 4.0.4). It comes in three freely downloadable versions: a complete installation DVD (including GNOME, KDE 3, and KDE SC 4), and two Live CDs (GNOME, and KDE SC 4 respectively). A KDE 3 Live CD was not produced due to limited resources. Package management and installation were made significantly faster with ZYpp.

openSUSE 11.1 was released on 18 December 2008. Updated software includes GNOME 2.24.1, Plasma 4.1.3 + K Desktop Environment 3.5.10, OpenOffice.org 3.0, VirtualBox 2.0.6, Compiz 0.7.8, Zypper 1.0.1, continued improvement in the software update stack, X.Org 7.4, Xserver 1.5.2, and Linux kernel 2.6.27.7. openSUSE 11.1 was the first Evergreen supported release.

openSUSE 11.2 was released on 12 November 2009. It includes Plasma 4.3, GNOME 2.28, Mozilla Firefox 3.5, OpenOffice.org 3.1, improved social network support, updated filesystems such as Ext4 as the new default and support for Btrfs, installer support for whole-disk encryption, significant improvements to YaST and Zypper, and all ISO images are hybrid and now support both USB and CD-ROM boot.

openSUSE 11.3 was released on 15 July 2010. It includes Plasma 4.4.4, GNOME 2.30.1, Mozilla Firefox 3.6.6, OpenOffice.org 3.2.1, SpiderOak support, support for the Btrfs filesystem and support for LXDE. It also updates the Linux kernel to version 2.6.34.

openSUSE 11.4 was finished on 3 March 2011, and released on 10 March 2011. It includes Plasma 4.6.0, GNOME 2.32.1, Mozilla Firefox 4.0 beta 12, and switched from OpenOffice.org to LibreOffice 3.3.1. It updates the Linux kernel to version 2.6.37.

=== 12.x series ===
openSUSE 12.1 was released on 16 November 2011. This includes Plasma 4.7 and GNOME 3.2 and Firefox 7.0.1. The Linux kernel was updated to 3.1.0 It also introduced an advanced disk snapshot tool, called Snapper, for managing Btrfs snapshots. openSUSE 12.1 was also the first release of openSUSE to use systemd by default rather than the traditional System V init. Users can still select to boot to System V init at startup time.

openSUSE 12.2 was to be released on 11 July 2012, but was postponed due to persistent stability issues. The final release candidate was eventually announced on 2 August 2012, and the final release date was 5 September 2012. 12.2 includes the desktop environments Plasma 4.8, GNOME 3.4, Firefox 14.0.1, and Xfce 4.10 and now uses Plymouth and GRUB 2 by default.

openSUSE 12.3 was released on schedule on 13 March 2013. This includes Plasma 4.10, GNOME 3.6, Firefox 19.0, LibreOffice 3.6, and the removal of SuSEconfig. Also, the Live CD images were replaced with Live USB images, and an Xfce rescue image.

=== 13.x series ===
openSUSE 13.1 was released on 19 November 2013, and includes updates to Plasma 4.11, GNOME 3.10, Firefox 25.0, and LibreOffice 4.1. Some other changes include a YaST port to Ruby, the LightDM KDE greeter, and experimental Wayland support in the GNOME Shell and KDE Plasma Desktop. openSUSE 13.1 is an Evergreen supported release, meaning it will receive community patches for 18 months after SUSE support ends.

openSUSE 13.2 was released on 4 November 2014, and includes updates to Plasma 4.11, KDE Applications 4.14, GNOME 3.14.1, Firefox 33.0 and LibreOffice 4.3.2.2.

=== Leap 42.x series ===
The openSUSE team decided that the next version would be based on SUSE Linux Enterprise (SLE). They named it "Leap 42" (42 being the answer to life, the universe and everything); this was a temporary anomaly in the version number sequence, as the following release series was numbered 15.x.

Leap 42.2 features KDE Plasma 5.8 LTS as its default desktop environment.

=== Leap 15.x series ===
openSUSE Leap 15 is based on SUSE Linux Enterprise (SLE). The name "Leap 15" is meant to match the SUSE Linux Enterprise version it is based on. Leap 15 (just like SUSE Linux Enterprise 15) uses Linux kernel 4.12 LTS, and the default desktop is KDE Plasma 5.12 LTS. It also allows users to switch to its enterprise variant - SUSE Linux Enterprise 15. Leap 15.5 (released on 7 June 2023) uses Linux kernel 5.14.21, KDE Plasma 5.27 and comes with a new support of Python 3.11. It is expected to be the penultimate release of Leap 15, with version 15.6 released on 12 June 2024.

=== Leap 16.x series ===
openSUSE Leap 16 was released on 1 October 2025. This version is based on SUSE Linux Enterprise 16. It features SELinux as a default Linux Security Module replacing AppArmor (AppArmor is still available if users want to use it). Agama is used as system installer replacing YaST. It also features an improved version of Zypper with support for parallel downloads.

== Version history ==
Starting with version Leap (after version 13.2), each major release (e.g. 15.0) is expected to be supported for at least 36 months, until the next major version is available (e.g. 16.0), aligned with SUSE Linux Enterprise Releases. Each minor release (e.g. 15.5, 15.6 etc.) is expected to be released annually, aligned with SUSE Linux Enterprise Service Packs, and users are expected to upgrade to the latest minor release within 6 months of its availability, leading to an expected support lifecycle of 18 months.

Slowroll and Tumbleweed are updated on a rolling basis, and require no upgrades beyond the regular installation of small updates and snapshots.

Evergreen was a community effort to prolong maintenance of selected openSUSE versions after they reached official end-of-life before the Leap series.

From 2009 to 2014, the openSUSE project aimed to release a new version every eight months. Prior to the Leap series, versions 11.2-13.2 were provided with critical updates for two releases plus two months, which resulted in an expected support lifetime of 18 months.

openSUSE releases
Name	Version	Codename	Release date	End of life		Kernel version
Name	Version	Codename	Release date	Regular	Evergreen	Kernel version
SUSE Linux	10.0	Prague	2005-10-06	2007-11-30	—N/a	2.6.13
SUSE Linux	10.1	Agama Lizard	2006-05-11	2008-05-31	—N/a	2.6.16
openSUSE	10.2	Basilisk Lizard	2006-12-07	2008-11-30	—N/a	2.6.18
openSUSE	10.3	—N/a	2007-10-04	2009-10-31	—N/a	2.6.22
openSUSE	11.0	—N/a	2008-06-19	2010-06-26	—N/a	2.6.25
openSUSE	11.1	—N/a	2008-12-18	2011-01-14	2012–04	2.6.27
openSUSE	11.2	Emerald	2009-11-12	2011-05-12	2013–11	2.6.31
openSUSE	11.3	Teal	2010-07-15	2012-01-16	—N/a	2.6.34
openSUSE	11.4	Celadon	2011-03-10	2012-11-05	2014-09	2.6.37
openSUSE	12.1	Asparagus	2011-11-16	2013-05-15	—N/a	3.1.0
openSUSE	12.2	Mantis	2012-09-05	2014-01-15	—N/a	3.4.6
openSUSE	12.3	Dartmouth	2013-03-13	2015-01-01	—N/a	3.7.10
openSUSE	13.1	Bottle	2013-11-19	2016-02-03	2016-11	3.11.6
openSUSE	13.2	Harlequin	2014-11-04	2017-01-16	—N/a	3.16.6
openSUSE Leap (SLE-based)	42.1	Malachite	2015-11-04	2017-05-17	—N/a	4.1.12
openSUSE Leap (SLE-based)	42.2	—N/a	2016-11-16	2018-01-26	—N/a	4.4
openSUSE Leap (SLE-based)	42.3	—N/a	2017-07-26	2019-06-30	—N/a	4.4
openSUSE Leap (SLE-based)	15.0	—N/a	2018-05-25	2019-12-03	—N/a	4.12
openSUSE Leap (SLE-based)	15.1	—N/a	2019-05-22	2021-01-31	—N/a	4.12
openSUSE Leap (SLE-based)	15.2	—N/a	2020-07-02	2021-12-31	—N/a	5.3.18
openSUSE Leap (SLE-based)	15.3	—N/a	2021-06-02	2022-12-31	—N/a	5.3.18
openSUSE Leap (SLE-based)	15.4	—N/a	2022-06-08	2023-12-31	—N/a	5.14.21
openSUSE Leap (SLE-based)	15.5	—N/a	2023-06-07	2024-12-31	—N/a	5.14.21
openSUSE Leap (SLE-based)	15.6	—N/a	2024-06-12	2026-04-30	—N/a	6.4
openSUSE Leap (SLE-based)	16.0	—N/a	2025-10-01	2027-10-31	—N/a	6.12
openSUSE Leap (SLE-based)	16.1	—N/a	2026-11-03	2028-10-31	—N/a	6.12
openSUSE	Slowroll		2023–06	monthly-Rolling	—N/a	?
openSUSE	Tumbleweed		2014–11	tested-Rolling	—N/a	Latest stable
openSUSE	Factory		2014–11	Development branch	—N/a	Latest
Legend: Unsupported Supported Latest version Preview version Future version

=== Historic (1994–2005) ===
SUSE releases
Name	Version	Release date	End of life	Kernel version
S.u.S.E. Linux (Slackware-based)	4/94	1994-03-29	?	1.0
S.u.S.E. Linux (Slackware-based)	7/94	1994–07	?	1.0.9
S.u.S.E. Linux (Slackware-based)	11/94	1994–11	?	1.1.62
S.u.S.E. Linux (Slackware-based)	4/95	1995–04	?	1.2.9
S.u.S.E. Linux (Slackware-based)	8/95	1995–08	?	1.1.12
S.u.S.E. Linux (Slackware-based)	11/95	1995–11	?	1.2.13
S.u.S.E. Linux (jurix-based)	4.2	1996–05	?	2.0.0
S.u.S.E. Linux (jurix-based)	4.3	1996–09	?	2.0.18
S.u.S.E. Linux (jurix-based)	4.4	1997–04	?	2.0.24
S.u.S.E. Linux (jurix-based)	4.4.1	1997-04-24	?	2.0.28
S.u.S.E. Linux (jurix-based)	5.0	1997–07	?	2.0.30
S.u.S.E. Linux (jurix-based)	5.1	1997–10	?	2.0.32
S.u.S.E. Linux (jurix-based)	5.2	1998-03-23	2000	2.0.33
S.u.S.E. Linux (jurix-based)	5.3	1998-09-10	2000	2.0.35
SuSE Linux	6.0	1998-12-21	2001-03-19	2.0.36
SuSE Linux	6.1	1999-04-07	2001-03-19	2.2.6
SuSE Linux	6.2	1999-08-12	2001-03-19	2.2.10
SuSE Linux	6.3	1999-11-25	2001-12-10	2.2.13
SuSE Linux	6.4	2000-03-09	2002-06-17	2.2.14
SuSE Linux	7.0	2000-09-27	2002-11-04	2.2.16
SuSE Linux	7.1	2001-04-21	2003-05-16	2.2.18 / 2.4.0
SuSE Linux	7.2	2001-06-15	2003-10-01	2.2.19 / 2.4.4
SuSE Linux	7.3	2001-10-13	2003-12-15	2.4.9
SuSE Linux	8.0	2002-04-22	2004-06-30	2.4.18
SuSE Linux	8.1	2002-09-30	2005-01-31	2.4.19
SuSE Linux	8.2	2003-04-07	2005-07-14	2.4.20
SUSE Linux	9.0	2003-10-24	2005-12-15	2.4.21 / 2.6 test
SUSE Linux	9.1	2004-05-06	2006-06-21	2.6.4
SUSE Linux	9.2	2004-10-22	2006-11-21	2.6.8
SUSE Linux	9.3	2005-04-20	2007-06-18	2.6.11
Name	Version	Release date	End of life	Kernel version

== Derivatives ==
The project has spawned a few forks and derivative versions over the years, namely SUPER, SLICK Linux, FyreLinux, Gibux (for the Turkish Revenue Administration), Lietukas Linux, Nelson GNU/Linux-libre, Edu Li-f-E, Linux Kamarada, GeckoLinux and RockStor

== Reception ==
Jesse Smith from DistroWatch Weekly reviewed openSUSE Leap 15.0, lauding the "work that has gone into the system installer", simplify for new users, but criticized the lack of media support, and performance issues, like a slow startup or slow shutdown.

== See also ==
- SUSE Linux Enterprise
- Red Hat Enterprise Linux
- Fedora Linux
