= Cockpit (software) =

Web-based server administration software

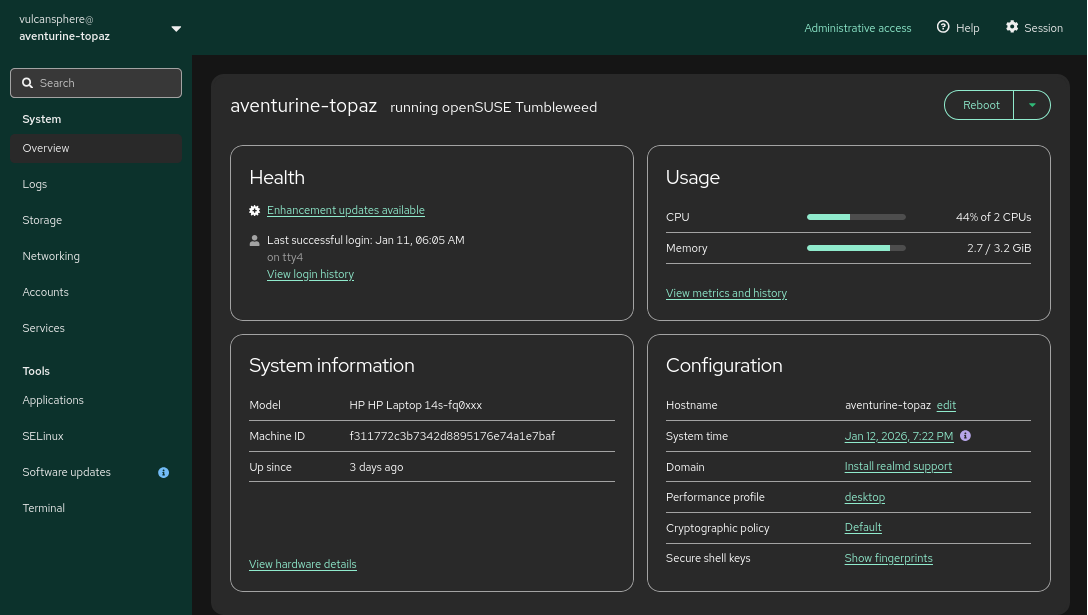
- Screenshot of Cockpit web interface on openSUSE
- Developer: Cockpit team
- Stable release: 361 / 21 April 2026; 27 days ago
- Written in: JavaScript, Python, C, TypeScript, SCSS, Shell
- Middleware: React
- Operating system: Linux
- Platform: Web
- Size: 13.6 MB
- Available in: English, Chinese, Czech, Dutch, Finnish, French, Georgian, German, Hebrew, Italian, Japanese, Korean, Norwegian, Polish, Portuguese, Russian, Slovakian, Spanish, Swedish, Turkish, Ukrainian
- Type: Remote administration
- License: LGPL-2.1
- Website: cockpit-project.org
- Repository: github.com/cockpit-project/cockpit

Cockpit is a web-based remote administration software for Linux servers. Cockpit is free, open source software released under the GNU Lesser General Public License 2.1. Sponsored by Red Hat.

Cockpit is available for Fedora Linux, Red Hat Enterprise Linux, CentOS, Debian, OpenSUSE, Arch Linux, and Ubuntu.

Cockpit uses systemd to configure and monitor parts of the system, firewalld for the firewall, PackageKit to update packages, and uses D-Bus to configure NetworkManager.

It can manage virtual machines and Podman containers, upgrade OSTree-based systems, manage ZFS disk partitions, and manage 389 Directory Server.

Red Hat Enterprise Linux uses Red Hat web console which is based on Cockpit.
