= Ximian =

1999–2003 American software company

Ximian, Inc.
- Type: Private
- Industry: Computer software
- Founded: Boston, Massachusetts, United States (19 October 1999; 27 years ago)
- Founder: Miguel de Icaza; Nat Friedman
- Fate: Acquired by Novell (4 August 2003; 23 years ago)
- Headquarters: Boston, Massachusetts, United States
- Area served: Worldwide
- Products: Ximian Desktop; Ximian Evolution; Ximian Connector

Ximian, Inc. (previously called Helix Code and originally named International Gnome Support) was an American company that developed, sold and supported application software for Linux and Unix based on the GNOME platform. It was founded by Miguel de Icaza and Nat Friedman in 1999 and was bought by Novell in 2003. Novell continued to develop Ximian's original products, while adding support for its own GroupWise and ZENworks software.

== History ==
Miguel de Icaza had a job interview at Microsoft in 1997 shortly before he started the GNOME project. At Microsoft he met Nat Friedman, who worked there as an intern. Afterwards they became good friends. In April 1999 Friedman came up with the idea to create a company to work on GNOME. The company was founded on 19 October 1999 as International GNOME Support, but its name was changed to Helix Code later. Because that name could not be trademarked the name was changed to Ximian on 10 January 2001.

Nat Friedman was the CEO of Ximian from its founding to 2001 when Ximian brought in David Patrick as CEO and President. Friedman became Vice President of Product Management. The company's business model was based on providing a mix of free and proprietary software, solutions and services. Ximian was a founding member of the GNOME Foundation and the Desktop Linux Consortium.

Ximian was acquired by Novell on 4 August 2003 to improve its offerings of Linux for the enterprise. Novell was in turn acquired by The Attachmate Group on 27 April 2011. In May 2011 The Attachmate Group laid off all its US staff working on Mono, which included De Icaza. He and Friedman then founded Xamarin on 16 May 2011, a new company to continue the development of Mono. On 24 February 2016, Microsoft announced that they had signed an agreement to acquire Xamarin.

== Products ==
Ximian both developed new products and "polished" existing free software projects to provide more consistent operation. These projects were packaged into its Ximian Desktop product — a range of integrated applications intended to provide all the tools a typical business user might require. So-called "Ximianized" versions of GNOME, OpenOffice.org, and Gaim were released, along with the following completely new products:

- Ximian Evolution
- Ximian Connector
- Red Carpet
- Bonobo
- Mono
