= ZENworks =

System management software

ZENworks Configuration Management
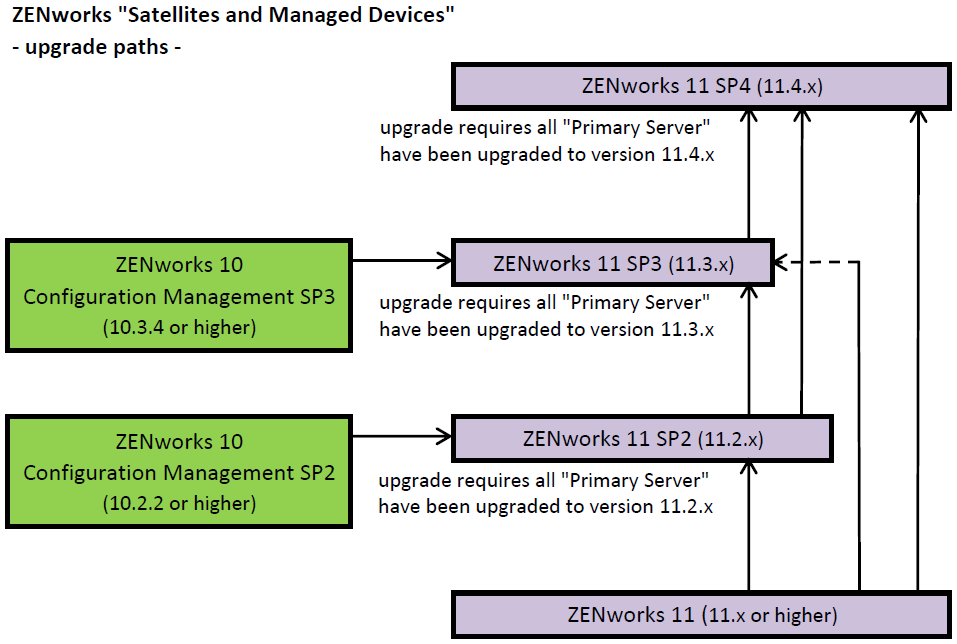
- Developer: OpenText
- Stable release: 25.4 / 22 December 2025; 10 months ago
- Operating system: Cross-platform
- Type: Systems management
- License: Proprietary
- Website: www.opentext.com/products/zenworks-suite

ZENworks, a suite of software products developed and maintained by OpenText for computer systems management, aims to manage the entire life cycle of servers, of desktop PCs (Windows, Linux or Mac), of laptops, and of handheld devices such as Android and iOS mobile phones and tablets. As of 2011, Novell planned to include Full Disk Encryption (FDE) functionality within ZENworks. ZENworks support multiple server platforms and multiple directory services.

== History ==
The name, "ZENworks", first appeared as "Z.E.N.works" in 1998 with ZENworks 1.0 and with ZENworks Starter Pack - a limited version of ZENworks 1.0 that came bundled with NetWare 5.0 (1998). Novell added server-management functionality, and the product grew into a suite consisting of:

- "ZENworks for Desktops" (ZfD)
- "ZENworks for Servers" (ZfS)
- "ZENworks for Handhelds" (ZfH)

Novell has continued to add components to the suite, which it sells under the consolidated name "ZENworks Suite".

The initial ZENworks products had a tight integration with Novell Directory Service (NDS). With the release of ZENworks Configuration Management 10 (2007) the product architecture completely changed, the product became directory agnostic and ZENworks Suite products were integrated into a single management framework.

ZENworks Releases:

Product	Version	Release date	Notes
Novell Application Launcher (NAL)	1	1996	Pre-ZENworks
Z.E.N.works	1.0	18 May 1998	Initial release
Z.E.N.works	1.1	16 Nov 1998	
Z.E.N.works Starter Pack		16 Nov 1998	
ZENworks	2	28 Jun 1999	
ZENworks for Servers	1	7 Mar 2000	
ZENworks for Desktops	3	22 Aug 2000	
ZENworks for Servers	2	31 Jan 2001	
ZENworks for Desktops	3.2	13 Aug 2001	
ZENworks for Servers	3	3 Apr 2002	
ZENworks for Desktops	4	27 Aug 2002	
ZENworks for Desktops	4.0.1	14 Apr 2002	
ZENworks Suite	6	14 Apr 2003	Version number jumped to version 6 as the ZENworks Suite merged ZFD 4, ZFS 3 and ZFH 5
ZENworks Suite	6.5	3 Jun 2004	
ZENworks Suite	7	26 Aug 2005	
ZENworks Configuration Management	10	21 Sep 2007	First release of new architecture, version 10 as ZENworks existed for 10 years
ZENworks Configuration Management	10.1	28 Jan 2009	
ZENworks Configuration Management	10.2	2 Jan 2010	
ZENworks Configuration Management	10.3	6 Apr 2012	
ZENworks Configuration Management	11	5 Jan 2011	
ZENworks Configuration Management	11.1	8 Nov 2011	
ZENworks Configuration Management	11.2	13 Dec 2012	Full Disk Encryption
ZENworks Configuration Management	11.3	9 Jul 2013	
ZENworks Configuration Management	11.4	Jul 2015	
ZENworks Configuration Management	2017	Dec 2016	Integration of Mobile Device Management
ZENworks Configuration Management	2017 Update 1	11 Jul 2017	
ZENworks Configuration Management	2017 Update 2	24 Jan 2018	
ZENworks Configuration Management	2017 Update 3	16 Aug 2018	
ZENworks Configuration Management	2017 Update 4	Jan 2019	
ZENworks Configuration Management	2020	Sep 2019	
ZENworks Configuration Management	2020 Update 1	Apr 2020	Patching and tracking CVEs
ZENworks Configuration Management	2020 Update 2	Aug 2021	Includes Antimalware
ZENworks Configuration Management	2020 Update 3	May 2022	
ZENworks Configuration Management	23.3	July 2023	New Patch Management Architecture
ZENworks Configuration Management	23.4	Nov 2023	Baseline version, New appliance installer
ZENworks Configuration Management	24.2	Jun 2024	
ZENworks Configuration Management	24.4	Nov 2024	
ZENworks Configuration Management	25.2	Jun 2025	New REST API
ZENworks Configuration Management	25.4	Dec 2025	New appliance installer, Patch Management enhancements
ZENworks Configuration Management	26.2	Jun 2026	Device Control Policy for Apple devices, FDE enhancements

== Elements of the ZENworks Suite ==
In the latest version of ZENworks known as ZENworks 25.4 the ZENworks Suite consists of seven individual products:

ZENworks Suite (March 2017)
ZENworks Suite / Platform		Product
ZENworks Suite	ZENworks 25.4 Platform	ZENworks Asset Management
ZENworks Suite	ZENworks 25.4 Platform	ZENworks Configuration Management
ZENworks Suite	ZENworks 25.4 Platform	ZENworks Endpoint Security Management
ZENworks Suite	ZENworks 25.4 Platform	ZENworks Full Disk Encryption
ZENworks Suite	ZENworks 25.4 Platform	ZENworks Mobile Device Management
ZENworks Suite	ZENworks 25.4 Platform	ZENworks Patch Management
ZENworks Suite		Hybrid Workspaces Packaging
ZENworks Suite		ZENworks Service Desk (Standard Edition)

Additionally, OpenText offers an ITIL version of "ZENworks Service Desk". This version is ITIL-certified by PinkVERIFY and supports ten ITIL v3 processes, e.g. Change, Incident, Problem and Service Level Management.

In terms of implementation, the ZENworks Agent (also known as the "ZENworks Management Daemon" or "zmd") installs, updates and removes software. The ZENworks Configuration Management (ZCM) addresses patching, endpoint security, asset management and provisioning.

== See also ==
- Systems Management
- Patch Management
- Mobile Device Management
- Full Disk Encryption
- Antimalware
