= NetWars =

1993 video game

- Developers: Edward N. Hill, Jr.
- Stable release: v3 / 1998; 28 years ago
- Operating system: DOS
- Type: Shoot 'em up

NetWars (originally called LiteYear) is an IPX-based 3D vector-graphics computer game released by Novell in 1993 for DOS to demonstrate NetWare capabilities. It was written by Edward N. Hill, Jr., one of Novell's engineers in its European Development Centre (EDC) in Hungerford, UK. Development started in 1989.

== Release ==
NetWars 2.06 came bundled with Novell DOS 7 and Personal NetWare 1.0 in form of a single executable named NETWARS.EXE. It replaced the text-based game NLSNIPES.EXE that came with NetWare Lite 1.1 since 1991, a newer implementation of the original Snipes, that traditionally came with Novell NetWare.

== Legacy ==
Since 1997, a much improved version 3 named Advanced NetWars shipped with Caldera OpenDOS 7.01, DR-DOS 7.02 and DR-DOS 7.03. It added support for SoundBlaster sound, joystick control, up to six players in multi-player mode, missiles and computer-controlled ships in multi-player mode, and it featured a new multi-player shoot-out mode, an improved single-player mode, an external view mode, as well as a shape editor NWDRAW to design own space-ships. Despite all these additions, the executable maintained a file size of less than 77 KB.

NetWars and Advanced NetWars inspired the development of clones such as Ingmar Frank's NetWarsGL for Win32 platforms with OpenGL in 2002 to 2004, or the Botolib-based NetWorst.
