= NWLink =

Implementation of IPX/SPX protocols

NWLink is Microsoft's implementation of Novell's IPX/SPX protocols. NWLink includes an implementation of NetBIOS atop IPX/SPX.

NWLink packages data to be compatible with client/server services on NetWare Networks. However, NWLink does not provide access to NetWare File and Print Services. To access the File and Print Services the Client Service for NetWare needs to be installed.

NWLink connects NetWare servers through the Gateway Service for NetWare or Client Service for NetWare and provides the transport protocol that connects Windows operating systems to IPX/SPX NetWare networks and compatible operating systems. NWLink supports NetBIOS and Windows Sockets application programming interfaces (API).

NWLink protocols are as follows:

- SPX/SPXII
- IPX
- Service Advertising Protocol (SAP)
- Routing Information Protocol (RIP)
- NetBIOS
- Forwarder

NWLink also provides the following functionalities:

- Runs other communication protocol stacks, such as Transmission Control Protocol/Internet Protocol (TCP/IP)
- Uses multiple frame types for network adapter binding

== Using NWLink IPX/SPX/NetBIOS ==
NWLink IPX/SPX/NetBIOS Compatible Transport is Microsoft's implementation of the Novell IPX/SPX (Internetwork Packet Exchange/Sequenced Packet Exchange) protocol stack. The Windows XP implementation of the IPX/SPX protocol stack adds NetBIOS support. The main function of NWLink is to act as a transport protocol to route packets through internetworks. By itself, the NWLink protocol does not allow you to access the data across the network. If you want to access NetWare File and Print Services, you must install NWLink and Client Services for NetWare (software that works at the upper layers of the OSI model to allow access to file and print services). One advantage of using NWLink is that is easy to install and configure.

== Configuring NWLink IPX/SPX ==
The only options that are configured for NWLink are the internal network number and the frame type. Normally, you leave both settings at their default values. The internal network number is commonly used to identify NetWare file servers. It is also used when you are running File and Print Services for NetWare or using IPX routing. The frame type specifies how the data is packaged for transmission over the network. If the computers that are using NWLink use different frame types, they are not able to communicate with each other. The default setting for frame type is Auto Detect, which will attempt to automatically choose a compatible frame type for your network. If you need to connect to servers that use various frame types, you should configure Manual Frame Type Detection, which will allow you to use a different frame type for each network.
