= Deathmatch (video games) =

Video game mode

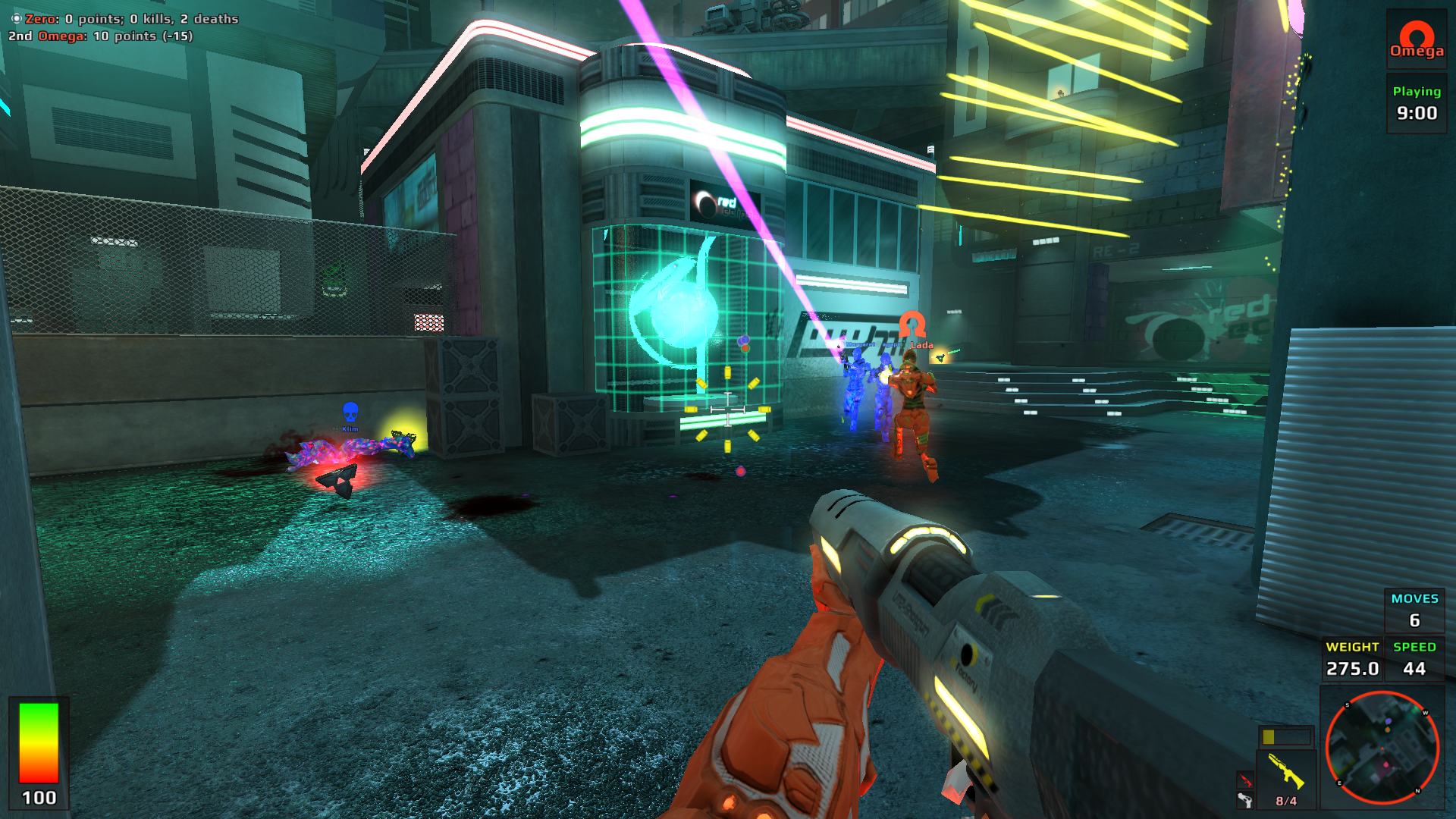
Team deathmatch mode in Red Eclipse. Two players on the red team confront two players from the blue team.

Deathmatch, also known as free-for-all, is a gameplay mode used in many shooter games, including first-person shooter (FPS) and real-time strategy (RTS) video games, in which the objective is to eliminate opposing players as many times as possible. A deathmatch session typically ends when a predefined frag limit or time limit is reached, with victory awarded to the player who achieves the highest number of frags. The deathmatch is an evolution of competitive multiplayer modes found in game genres such as fighting games and racing games moving into other genres.

== Gameplay ==
In a typical first-person shooter (FPS) deathmatch session, players connect to a shared computer network in a peer-to-peer model or a client–server model, either locally or over the Internet. Players may also communicate with one another during gameplay, commonly through voice chat systems. Deathmatches have different rules and goals depending on the game, but a common format in FPS games is a free-for-all structure, where each player competes against all others. The game begins with each player being spawned at random locations selected from a predefined set of spawn points. Being spawned entails having the score, health, armor and equipment reset to default values, typically including zero score, full health, no armor, and a basic firearm along with a melee weapon. After a session has begun, players may join or leave the game dynamically.

=== Players ===
In this context a player is either a human-controlled character or a character operated by a computer software AI commonly referred to as a bot. Both human players and bots typically share the same base visual model, although in most modern games players may select a skin, a cosmetic graphics model that operates on the same set of movements as the base model. Human-controlled characters and bots usually share identical physical properties, including initial health, armor, weapon capabilities, available maneuvers, and movement speed, differing only in their control logic. For novice players, the difference between a human opponent and a computer-controlled opponent may be minimal. For experienced players, however, the absence of human decision-making is often noticeable in bot behavior, even when compensated for by enhanced accuracy or reaction speed. However, some systems deliberately inform the player when inspecting the score list which player(s) are bots and which are human (e.g. OpenArena). In the event that the player is aware of the nature of the opponent it will affect the cognitive process of the player regardless of the player's skill.

Modern implementations allow for new players to join after the game has started.The maximum number of players is defined by the game, map, and rule set, and is typically configurable by the server. Some maps are designed for small numbers of players, while others support larger player counts.

=== Deaths ===
The goal for each player is killing the other players by any means possible which counts as a frag, either by direct assault or manipulating the map, the latter counts as a frag in some games, some not; in either case—to attain the highest score—this process should be repeated as many times as possible, with each iteration performed as quickly as possible. The session may have a time limit, a frag limit, or no limit at all. If there is a limit then the player with the most frags will eventually win when the session ends.

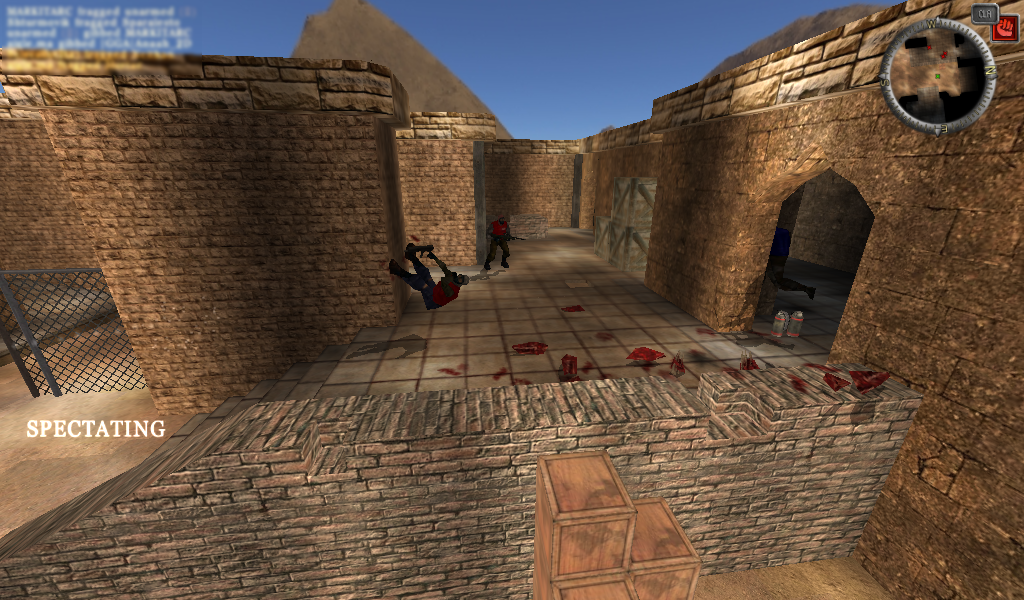
A player in spectator mode

The health variable will determine if a player is wounded; however, a wounded player does not entail reduced mobility or functionality in most games, and in most games a player will not bleed to death. A player will die when the health value reaches equal to or less than 0, if the value is reduced to a very low negative value, the result may be gibbing depending upon the game.

In most games, when a player dies (i.e. is fragged), the player will lose all equipment gained and the screen will continue to display the visible (still animated) scene that the player normally sees, and the score list is usually displayed—the frags. The display does not go black when the player dies. Usually the player can choose to instantly respawn or remain dead.

The armor variable affects the health variable by reducing the damage taken, the reduction in health is in concept inversely proportional to the value of the armor times the actual damage caused; with the obvious differences in various implementations. Some games may account for the location of the body injured when the damage is deduced, while many—especially older implementations—do not. In most games, no amount of armor causes any reduced mobility—i.e. is never experienced as a weight issue by the player.

The lost equipment (usually not including the armor) of a dead player can usually be picked up by any player (even the fragged player, respawned) who gets to it first.

=== Simulation ===
Newtonian physics are often only somewhat accurately simulated, common in many games is the ability of the player to modify the player's own vector to some degree while airborne, e.g. by retarding a forward airborne flight by moving backwards, or even jumping around a corner. Other notable concepts derived from the physics of FPS game engines are i.a. at least bunny-hopping, strafe-jumping and rocket-jumping—in all of which the player exploits the particular characteristics of the physics engine in question to obtain a high speed and/or height, or other attribute(s); e.g. with rocket-jumping the player will jump and fire at rocket at the floor area immediately under the feet of the same player, which will cause the player to jump higher compared to a regular jump as a result of the rocket blast (at the obvious expense of the health variable being somewhat reduced from self-inflicted injury). The types of techniques available and how the techniques may be performed by the player differs from the physics implementation as is as such also game dependent.

Most modern deathmatch games features a high level of graphic violence; a normal modern implementation will contain high quality human characters being killed, e.g. moderate amounts of blood, screams of pain and death, exploding bodies with associated gibs are common. Some games feature a way to disable and/or reduce the level of gore. However, the setting of the game is usually that of a fictional world, the player may resurrect in the form of mentioned respawning and the characters will usually have superhuman abilities, e.g. able to tolerate numerous point blank hits from a machine gun directly to the head without any armour, jumping extreme inhuman distances and falling extreme distances to mention a few things. These factors together may make the player experience the game less real as the game contains highly unreal and unrealistic elements.

=== Powerups ===
All normal maps will contain various power-ups; i.e. extra health, armor, ammunition and other (more powerful than default) weapons. Once collected by a player the power-up will respawn after a defined time at the same location, the time for an item to respawn depends upon the game mode and the type of the item. In some deathmatch modes power-ups will not respawn at all.

Certain power-ups are especially powerful, which can often lead to the game rotating around controlling power-ups—i.e. all other things being equal, the player who controls the strongest power-ups (collecting the items most often) is the one that will have the best potential for making the best score.

=== Sessions ===
If the session does have a frag or time limit a new session will start briefly after the current session has been concluded, during the respite the players will be allowed to observe the score list, chat and will usually see an animated pseudo overview display of the map as background for the score list. Some games have a system to allow each player to announce they are now ready to begin the new session, some do not. The new sessions might be on a different map—based on a map list kept on the server—or it might always be on the same map if there is no such rotating map list.

Common in many games is some form of message broadcast and private message system; the broadcast message system announces public events, e.g. if a player died it will often be informed who died and how, if fragged, then often by what weapon; the same system will also often announce if a player joins or leaves the game, and may announce how many frags are left in total and other important messages, including errors or warnings from the game; instant text messages from other players are also displayed with this system. The private message system, in contrast, only prints messages for individual players, e.g. if player A picks up a weapon, player A will get a message to confirm that the weapon was picked up.

== History ==
Even before the term deathmatch was first used, there existed games with a similar gameplay mode. MIDI Maze was a multiplayer first-person shooter for the Atari ST, released in 1987, which has been suggested as the first example of deathmatch gameplay. Sega's 1988 third-person shooter arcade game Last Survivor featured eight-player deathmatch. Another early example of a deathmatch mode in a first-person shooter was Taito's 1992 video game Gunbuster. It allowed two-player cooperative gameplay for the mission mode, and featured an early deathmatch mode, where either two players could compete against each other or up to four players could compete in a team deathmatch, consisting of two teams with two players each competing against each other.

The phrase death match was originally used in wrestling, starting in the 1950s, to denote certain brutal hardcore wrestling fights. The term "death match" in this sense appeared in the 1992 fighting arcade game World Heroes, where it denotes a game mode taking place in an arena with environmental hazards.

The term deathmatch in the context of multiplayer video games may have been coined by game designer John Romero, while he and lead programmer John Carmack were developing the LAN multiplayer mode for the video game Doom. Romero commented on the birth of the FPS deathmatch:

"Sure, it was fun to shoot monsters, but ultimately these were soulless creatures controlled by a computer. Now gamers could play against spontaneous human beings—opponents who could think and strategize and scream. We can kill each other!' If we can get this done, this is going to be the fucking coolest game that the planet Earth has ever fucking seen in its entire history!'"

According to Romero, the deathmatch concept was inspired by fighting games. At id Software, the team frequently played Street Fighter II, Fatal Fury and Art of Fighting during breaks, while developing elaborate rules involving trash-talk and smashing furniture or tech. Romero stated that "what we were doing was something that invented deathmatch" and that "Japanese fighting games fueled the creative impulse to create deathmatch in our shooters."

Some games give a different name to these types of matches, while still using the same underlying concept. For example, in Perfect Dark, the name "Combat" is used and in Halo, deathmatch is known as "Slayer".

=== Precursors ===
Early multiplayer games spread across multiple screens include Spasim and Maze War. In 1982 Drew Major and others at SuperSet played deathmatches on their networked IBM PC video game Snipes. The game shipped with Novell NetWare, and many customers told Major of Snipes deathmatches after work hours.

Early evidence of the term's application to graphical video games exists. On August 6, 1982, Intellivision game developers Russ Haft and Steve Montero challenged each other to a game of Bi-Planes, a 1981 Intellivision release in which multiple players control fighter planes with the primary purpose of repeatedly killing each other until a limit is reached. Once killed, a player would be respawned in a fixed location, enjoying a short period of protection from attacks. The contest was referred to, at that time, as a deathmatch.

== Variations ==
In a team deathmatch, the players are organized into two or more teams, with each team having its own frag count. Friendly fire may or may not cause damage, depending on the game and the rules used – if it does, players that kill a teammate (called a team kill) usually decrease their own score and the team's score by one point; in certain games, they may also themselves be killed as punishment, and/or may be removed from the game for repeat offenses. The team with the highest frag-count at the end wins.

In a last man standing deathmatch (or a battle royale game), players start with a certain number of lives (or just one, in the case of battle royale games), and lose these as they die. Players who run out of lives are eliminated for the rest of the match, and the winner is the last and only player with at least one life. See the "Fundamental changes" section in the "Last Man Standing" article for more insight.

Any arbitrary multiplayer game with the goal for each player to kill every other player(s) as many times as possible can be considered to be a form of deathmatch. In real time strategy games, deathmatch can refer to a game mode where all players begin their empires with large amounts of resources. This saves them the time of accumulation and lets hostilities commence much faster and with greater force. Destroying all the enemies is the only way to win, while in other modes some other victory conditions may be used (king of the hill, building a wonder...)

== History, fundamental changes ==
=== Doom ===
The first-person shooter version of deathmatch, originating in Doom by id Software, had a set of unmodifiable rules concerning weapons, equipment and scoring, known as "Deathmatch 1.0".

- Items do not respawn, e.g. health, armour, ammunition; however weapons had a fixed status as available to any arbitrary player except the player who acquired the weapon – i.e. the weapon did not in fact disappear as items do when picked up. The player who acquires the weapon can only collect it anew after respawning (this sometimes leads to lack of ammunition if a player survives long enough, eventually leading to one's death due to being unable to fight back)
- Suicide (such as falling into lava or causing an explosion too close to the player, or getting crushed by a crushing ceiling etc.) did not entail negative score points.

Within months, these rules were modified into "Deathmatch 2.0" rules (included in Doom v1.2 patch). These rules were optional, the administrator of the game could decide on using DM 1.0 or DM 2.0 rules.

The changes were:

- Picking up an object removes it from the map.
- Objects re-appear 30 seconds after being picked up and can be picked up by anyone; bonus objects which provide significant advantages (invisibility power-up etc.) re-appear after much longer delay, some of them may not reappear at all.
- Suicide counts as −1 frag.

Notable power-ups that are featured in most consecutive games include the soul spheres. Although the name and/or graphics may be different in other games the concept and feature of the power-up remains the same in other games.

=== Corridor 7: Alien Invasion CD version ===
Corridor 7: Alien Invasion released by Capstone Software in 1994.

- The first FPS to include multiple character classes.
- The first FPS to include DM specific maps.

=== Rise of the Triad ===
Rise of the Triad was first released as shareware in 1994 by Apogee Software, Ltd. and honed an expansive multiplayer mode that pioneered a variety of deathmatch features.

- It introduced the Capture the Flag mode to the first-person-shooter genre as Capture the Triad.
- It was the first FPS to have an in-game scoreboard.
- It was the first FPS to deliver its level of multiplayer customization through a plethora of options affecting aspects of the level played like gravity or weapon persistence.
- It was the first FPS to have voice macros and the ability to talk to players via microphone.
- It introduced a unique point system that awards different numbers of points for different kills (for instance, a missile kill is worth a point more than a bullet kill).

=== Hexen: Beyond Heretic ===
Hexen: Beyond Heretic released by Raven Software in 1995.

- The first to feature multiple character classes with their own weapons; some items also functioned differently based on the class using them.

=== Quake ===
- Quake released in 1996 by ID Software, was the first FPS deathmatch game to feature in-game joining.
- Quake was the first FPS deathmatch game to feature AI operated deathmatch players (bots), although not as a feature of the released product, but rather in the form of a community created content.
- Quake popularized rocket-jumping.

Notable power-ups that are featured in most consecutive games are i.a. the quad damage. Although the name and/or graphics may be different in other games the concept and feature of the power-up remains the same in other games.

=== Unreal ===
With the game Unreal (1998, by Epic), the rules were enhanced with some widely accepted improvements:

- spawn protection (usually 2–4 seconds), which is a period of invulnerability after a player (re)enters combat (such as after being killed and respawning); spawn protection was automatically terminated when the player used a weapon (including non-attack usage, such as zooming the sniper rifle). Spawn protection prevents "easy frags" — killing a player which just spawned and is slightly disoriented and almost unarmed.
- "suicide-cause tracking" – if a player dies by "suicide" that was caused by some other player's action, such as knocking him off the cliff or triggering a crusher or gas chamber, the player that caused such death is credited the kill and the killed player does not lose a frag (it's not counted as a suicide). This concept increases the entertainment potential of the game (as it gives players options to be "cunning"), but it at the same time adds complexity, which may be the reason why Epic's main competitor, Id software, did not implement this concept into Quake III Arena (just as they did not implement spawn protection).

=== Unreal Tournament ===
- "combat achievements tracking" – Unreal Tournament (1999, by Epic) added statistics tracking. The range of statistics being tracked is very wide, such as:
  - precision of fire with each weapon (percentage of hits to fired ammunition)
  - kills with each weapon, being killed by particular weapon, and being killed when holding particular weapon.
  - headshots (lethal hits of combatant heads with sniper rifles and some other powerful weapons)
  - killing sprees: Killing 5, 10, 15, 20 or 25 combatants without dying is called a killing spree, each greater kill count being considered more valuable and having a unique title (respectively; Killing Spree, Rampage, Dominating, Unstoppable, Godlike). The game tracked how many times has the player achieved each of these titles.
- consecutive kills: when a player kills a combatant within 5 seconds after a previous kill, a consecutive kill occurs. The timer starts ticking anew, allowing a third kill, a fourth kill etc. Alternatively, killing several enemies with a mega weapon (such as the Redeemer, which resembles a nuclear rocket) also counts as consecutive kill. The titles of these kills are: Double Kill (2), Multi kill (3), Ultra kill (4), Megakill (5), MONSTERKILL (6; 5 in the original Unreal Tournament). For comparison, id Software's "Quake III Arena" tracks double kills, but a third kill soon after results in another double kill award.

=== Quake III Arena ===
This game's approach to combat achievements tracking is different from Unreal Tournament. In deathmatch, the player might be rewarded with awards for the following tricks:

- "perfect!" – winning a round of deathmatch without getting killed
- "impressive!" – hitting with two consecutive shots or hitting two enemies with one shot from the railgun (a powerful, long-range hitscan weapon with a slow rate of fire)
- "humiliation!" – killing an opponent with the melee razor-like gauntlet (the killed player hears the announcement too, but the fact of being humiliated is not tracked for him).
- "accuracy" – having over 50% of hits-to-shots ratio.

=== Last Man Standing ===
The Last Man Standing (LMS) version of deathmatch is fundamentally different from deathmatch. In deathmatch, it does not matter how many times the player dies, only how many times the player kills. In LMS, it is the exact opposite – the important task is "not to die". Because of this, two activities that are not specifically addressed in deathmatch have to be controlled in LMS.

- "Camping", which is a recognized expression for staying in one location (usually somewhat protected or with only one access route) and eventually using long range weapons, such as a sniper rifle, from that location. In standard deathmatch, campers usually accumulate fewer frags than players who actively search for enemies, because close range combat usually generates frags faster than sniping from afar. In LMS, however, camping increases the average lifespan. Unreal Tournament 2003 addresses this unfairness by indicating players who are camping and providing other players with navigation to campers.
- "Staying dead" – after dying, player representations lie on the ground (where applicable) and are shown the results of the game in progress. They have to perform some action, usually click the "Fire" key or button, to respawn and reenter combat. This principle prevents players who might have been forced by real world situations (be it a sudden cough or a door ring) to leave the computer from dying over and over. In standard deathmatch, a player who stays dead is not a problem, as the goal is to score the most frags, not die the least times. In LMS, however, a player that would be allowed to stay dead after being killed for the first time might wait through most of the fight and respawn when there's only one opponent remaining. Because of this, Unreal Tournament 2003 automatically respawns a player immediately after being killed.

== See also ==
- Player versus environment
- Player versus player
- Battle royale game
