= NLSP =

NLSP is an acronym for:

- NetWare Link Services Protocol
- Next-to-Lightest Supersymmetric Particle
