= Snipes (video game) =

1983 video game

- Screenshot
- Developers: Drew Major; Dale Neibaur; Mark Hurst; Kyle Powell
- Stable release: v1.0 / 1983
- Operating system: Novell NetWare, MS-DOS
- Type: Maze
- Website: www.novell.com

Snipes (diminutive for Snipers) is a text-mode networked computer game that was created in 1983 by SuperSet Software. Snipes is officially credited as being the original inspiration for NetWars. It is one of the earliest text mode multi player games, running on Novell NetWare systems.

== Gameplay ==
The objective of the game is to control the creature by moving it around a maze to destroy snipes and their hives, and/or destroy other networked players.

The player must first specify the number of snipes, hives and difficulty before they play. Each game is different because the computer generates a random new maze.

The creature is moved using the keyboard arrow keys and shoots in different directions with the A, S, D and W keys. By combining keys, diagonal movement and shooting can be achieved. Pressing the spacebar can provide extra velocity to run away from difficult situations from the snipes.

Several level options are available. First, a letter is chosen, which controls the environment settings: what bad guys are available, their accuracy at attacking, whether or not the player's diagonal shots bounce off walls, whether running into a wall will simply block or kill the player, and whether the hives have a partial resistance to snipes' shots. The next choice is a number, which controls the maximum number of snipes that may exist, how many hives are initially created within the maze, and how many lives the player is given. There are 234 possible levels, from A1 to Z9, that the player can select in the game.

=== Technical details ===
A requirement to play the multiplayer version of Snipes is that all users share a common network drive. It suggests that the various clients communicate to each other via shared file. The exact implementation details of this are not known but experiments have shown that Snipes can be played between Windows workstations in a Command Prompt window under Windows XP, provided that each user maps a drive to the executable location with read/write rights. This also implies that IPX is not directly used by Snipes to communicate between clients.

== Legacy ==
SuperSet Software sold several thousand copies of the single-player version of Snipes through ComputerLand. The company wrote a networked multiplayer version to demonstrate its networking technology at the June 1982 National Computer Conference. Seeing Snipes being played simultaneously on Apple II, TRS-80, and Commodore PET persuaded Novell owner Safeguard Scientifics that SuperSoft's networking technology was valuable. Novell used the technology to develop NetWare.

As the first networking-aware software when users only used NetWare to share files and printers, sales demonstrations typically ended with Snipes. SuperSet retained ownership of the game although shipping with NetWare; Drew Major reported that many customers told him of employees' Snipes deathmatches after work hours. Novell also used it as a stress test to certify network cards and drivers as NetWare-compatible. A newer implementation of the game was developed and shipped with NetWare Lite 1.1 in September 1991. Its NLSNIPES.EXE executable had a filesize of less than 18 KB. It was replaced by the NetWars 2.06 game, that came bundled with Personal NetWare 1.0 and Novell DOS 7 since late 1993.

In July 2016, a port of the original Snipes to the Simple Direct Media Layer became available. The port was done by reverse engineering the original code and permission was granted by Major and Kyle Powell to make it public. The C++ source code is available at GitHub.

Clones were released for Linux and Android.

== See also ==
- NetWars
