= Novell BorderManager =

Network security application

- Developer(s): Novell, Inc.
- Initial release: August 25, 1997
- Stable release: 3.9 SP2 / February 19, 2009; 16 years ago
- Platform: NetWare
- Type: Network access control
- License: Proprietary
- Website: novell.com/products/bordermanager

Novell BorderManager was a multi purpose network security application developed by Novell, Inc. Novell BorderManager is designed as a proxy server, firewall, and VPN access point. Novell has announced that migration to SuperLumin 4.0 Proxy Cache is "Novell's preferred firewall and proxy solution for NetWare customers upgrading to Novell Open Enterprise Server on Linux."

== History ==
BorderManager was designed to run on top of the NetWare kernel and takes advantage of the fast file services that the NetWare kernel delivers. Aside from the more easily copied firewall and VPN access point services, Novell designed the proxy services to retrieve web data with a server-to-server connection rather than a client-to-server connection as all of the prior proxy servers on the market had done. This retrieval method along with NetWare's fast file IO and other proprietary code made BorderManager's proxy engine one of the fastest in existence.

In 2003, Novell announced the successor product to NetWare: Open Enterprise Server (OES). First released in March 2005, OES completes the separation of the services traditionally associated with NetWare, i.e. file and print. This makes it possible for the customer to choose which NetWare or Linux kernel the services will run on.

At this time Novell all but announced the end of development for the NetWare kernel (numerous public and private statements that there is no 64-bit future for NetWare and that Linux is the path to 64-bit computing for OES). To follow through on this migration path, Novell began porting all applications to Linux. The company began looking at alternate ways to deliver these same services, as firewall and VPN access point services of equivalent functionality are readily available in the free/open-source community and there are also basic proxy services as well (i.e. Squid). The desire to deliver a functional equivalent could not be done by a full software code port as much of the cache engine was sold as part of the Volera Excelerator and Novell holds a great desire to use or create open-source software for basic services such as this.

Novell entered an agreement with Astaro to relabel Astaro Security Gateway and license it as Novell Security Manager. The product was removed from the Novell price list on 15 February 2007.

== Future ==
In the late summer of 2006 Novell announced, that there would be a BorderManager 3.9 release.

At the Novell BrainShare conference in 2010, Novell announced "SuperLumin 4.0 Proxy Cache as path forward for BorderManager customers." They also announced "extended BorderManager General Support for two years (through March 7, 2012)" to give customers "adequate time to make the move."

As of November 2011, the Novell Support Lifecycle page states that "Border Manager 3.9 General Support will be extended to September 30, 2013, to make it easy for customers to plan and execute their upgrade to Novell Open Enterprise Server. The upgrade path for Border Manager remains SuperLumin Nemesis."

== Third-Party Filtering Solutions ==
Third-party filtering solutions are available for Novell BorderManager, from the following companies:

- Connectotel - LinkWall Suite and ContentFilter
- Secure Computing - N2H2/Bess
- SurfControl
