= Drew Major =

American computer scientist and entrepreneur

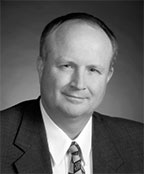
- Major in 2010
- Born: June 17, 1956 (age 69); Los Angeles, California
- Occupation(s): Computer Scientist, Novell, Move Networks
- Website: http://www.novell.com

Drew Major (born June 17, 1956) is a computer scientist and entrepreneur. He was one of the principal engineers of the Novell NetWare operating system from early in Novell's history.

== Biography ==
He was born in California but has lived most of his life in Utah. Major received a Bachelor of Science degree from Brigham Young University in 1980, and graduated with honors in mathematics and computer science.

== Career ==
=== SuperSet Software ===
SuperSet Software was a group founded by friends and former Eyring Research Institute (ERI) co-workers Drew Major, Dale Neibaur, Kyle Powell, and later joined by Mark Hurst. Their work was based on classwork that they started in October 1981 at Brigham Young University, Provo, Utah, USA, and upon previous work experiences at Eyring Research Institute working with the Xerox Network Systems (XNS) protocol which led to the development of the Novell IPX and SPX networking protocols, and the NetWare operating system.

In 1983, Ray Noorda took over leadership of Novell and engaged the SuperSet group to work on networking products. The team was originally assigned to create a CP/M disk sharing system to help network the CP/M hardware that Novell was selling at the time. Under Ray Noorda's leadership, the group developed a successful file sharing system for the newly introduced IBM-compatible PC.

The group also wrote a text-mode game called Snipes and used it to test the new network and demonstrate its capabilities.

=== Novell ===
Major joined Novell in 1983, and his partners Kyle Powell, Dale Neibaur, and Mark Hurst began to work in enabling PCs to share files and other resources via a local area network (LAN). Major was the lead architect and developer of the NetWare operating system for over 15 years. Major left Novell in 2003.

In 1995, Byte named him as one of the twenty people with the greatest impact on microcomputing.

=== Move Networks ===
After leaving Novell, Major co-founded video networking company Move Networks, Inc.

In 2006, Move Networks was acquired by EchoStar. He later co-founded Arroyo Video Solutions, which was acquired by Cisco in 2006. Major then became the Chief Technology Officer (CTO) of Sling TV, a subsidiary of Dish Network, where he has been instrumental in developing scalable cloud-based digital video recorders (DVRs) and modernizing traditional TV advertising systems.

== Personal life ==
He resides in Orem, Utah, with his wife and four sons.

External videos
- Drew Major Utah Valley Entrepreneurial Forum Hall of Fame, posted November 4, 2013
