= NetWare Link Services Protocol =

Routing protocol for IPX

NetWare Link Services Protocol (NLSP) is a routing protocol for Internetwork Packet Exchange based on the Intermediate-System-to-Intermediate-System (IS-IS) protocol developed by the International Organization for Standardization (ISO). NLSP enables NetWare servers to exchange routing and service information without the high broadcast overhead generated by Routing Information Protocol and Service Advertising Protocol. Instead of periodically retransmitting its information every few minutes like RIP and SAP, NLSP only transmits every two hours, or when there is a change in a route or service, making it much more suitable for use over a wide area network.

== See also ==
- IS-IS
- Routing Information Protocol
- Service Advertising Protocol
- NetWare
