= IPrint =

Online print server developed by Novell

iPrint is a print server developed by Novell, now owned by Micro Focus. iPrint enabled users to install a device driver for a printer directly from a web browser, and to submit print jobs over a computer network. It could process print jobs routed through the internet using the Internet Printing Protocol (IPP).

The iPrint server ran on Novell's NetWare operating system. Windows, Linux, and Mac OS clients needed Novell's iPrint client software to make use of iPrint services.

Although iPrint is bound to Novell Distributed Print Services (NDPS), it does not require a Novell client but only an iPrint client.

== See also ==
- Novell Embedded Systems Technology (NEST)
