= Open Enterprise Server =

Server operating system

- Developer: OpenText
- OS family: Linux (Unix-like) and NetWare
- Working state: Current
- Source model: Open source / Closed source
- Latest release: OES 23.4 / October 2023; 3 years ago
- Marketing target: Enterprise software; Server
- Package manager: RPM Package Manager
- Preceded by: NetWare 6.5
- Official website: www.opentext.com/products/enterprise-server

Open Enterprise Server (OES) is a Linux-based server operating system published by OpenText. It combines SUSE Linux Enterprise Server with directory, identity, file, storage, print and network services derived from Novell NetWare.

Novell introduced OES in March 2005 as a migration path from NetWare. The first release offered both NetWare- and Linux-kernel variants; later releases standardized on the SLES base while retaining services and protocols intended to let existing NetWare environments migrate gradually.

== OES 1 and OES 2 ==
Novell released OES 1, the first version of OES, on 25 March 2005. Since some users wanted backward compatibility with NetWare, Novell offered two installation options: OES-NetWare and OES-Linux. These are two different operating systems with different kernels and different userlands.

OES-NetWare is NetWare v6.5 equipped with NetWare Loadable Modules for various Novell services (such as NetWare Core Protocol, Novell eDirectory, Novell Storage Services, and iPrint) and open-source software (such as OpenSSH, Apache Tomcat, and the Apache HTTP Server).

OES-Linux is based on the SUSE Linux Enterprise Server (SLES) with added NetWare services ported to the Linux kernel: e.g. the NetWare Core Protocol, Novell eDirectory, Novell Storage Services, and iPrint.

Novell released OES 2, the second version of OES, on 12 October 2007. It was the first SLES-Linux-kernel-only OES, but it retained the OES-NetWare operating system option, as NetWare 6.5 SP7 can run as a paravirtualized guest inside the Xen hypervisor. The SLES base of OES 2 was later updated to SLES 10 SP1.

Features introduced in OES 2 include:

- 32-bit system or 64-bit system supporting 64 bit and 32 bit applications
- Hardware virtualization
- Dynamic Storage Technology, which provides Novell Shadow Volumes
- Windows domain services (from OES 2 SP1)
- Apple Filing Protocol (AFP) with Cross Protocol Locking AFP-NCP-Samba (CPL) (from OES 2 SP1)

== OES 2015 ==
- OES 2015 was released on 31 August 2015, adding new features and improved performance.
- OES 2015 SP1 was released on 14 June 2016 and was the first to be rebranded Micro Focus after Micro Focus purchased The Attachmate Group which included Novell.

== OES 2018 & 2023 ==
Micro Focus released OES 2018 in November 2017, with three service releases (the last being OES 2018 SP3 in July 2021). All releases were based on SLES 12 and its service packs.

While SUSE was sold by Micro Focus in 2018, SLES support and updates are included with an OES installation, provided at least one OES component is installed.

OES 2023 was released in October 2022, using a base of SLES 15 SP4. It includes a new Unified Management Console (UMC) to supersede iManager for server management, TLS 1.3 support and was bundled with NetIQ eDirectory 9.2.7. Breaking with previous convention, OES 23.4 (rather than SP1) was released in October 2023, and was rebranded to OpenText, after their purchase of Micro Focus earlier in the year. General support was extended to 3 years from the usual 2 years of previous releases.

== Architecture and services ==
OES is installed on a SLES base, but administrators select the OES service patterns required for each server. Identity is normally supplied by eDirectory or by Domain Services for Windows, which presents eDirectory information through interfaces compatible with Active Directory. Storage can use Linux file systems or Novell Storage Services (NSS), whose volume and rights model was carried forward from NetWare.

The platform's principal service groups include:

- file access through NetWare Core Protocol (NCP), CIFS/SMB, FTP and web-based interfaces;
- NSS storage, Dynamic Storage Technology and Distributed File Services;
- iPrint print services;
- eDirectory, LDAP, Linux User Management and Domain Services for Windows;
- DNS, DHCP, clustering and business-continuity services; and
- browser-based administration through Unified Management Console and other service-specific tools.

== See also ==
- SUSE Linux
- SUSE Linux Enterprise Server
