= Novell S-Net =

- Developer: Novell, Inc.
- OS family: Network operating systems
- Source model: Closed source
- Initial release: 1983
- Available in: English
- Supported platforms: Motorola 68000
- License: Proprietary
- Official website: www.novell.com

S-Net (a.k.a. ShareNet) was a network operating system and the set of network protocols it used to talk to client machines on the network. Released by Novell in 1983, the S-Net operating system was an entirely proprietary operating system written for the Motorola 68000 processor.

Physically, S-Net used a star topology to allow up to 24 DOS and/or CP/M machines to connect directly to the 68B server machine. Ethernet and ARCnet were both considered but dismissed on cost grounds. S-NET used cheap dual twisted-pair phone wire and since each client computer was directly connected, the need for complex network addressing was eliminated. The 68B server ran NetWare/S-Net

S-Net has also been called NetWare 68, with the 68 denoting the 68000 processor. It was superseded in 1985 by NetWare 86, which was written for the Intel 8086 processor. NetWare/86 which came in several editions and paved the way for the subsequent monolithic version of NetWare.
