= ZDM =

ZDM may stand for:

- ZENworks Desktop Management
- Zigong Dinosaur Museum
