= Novell BrainShare =

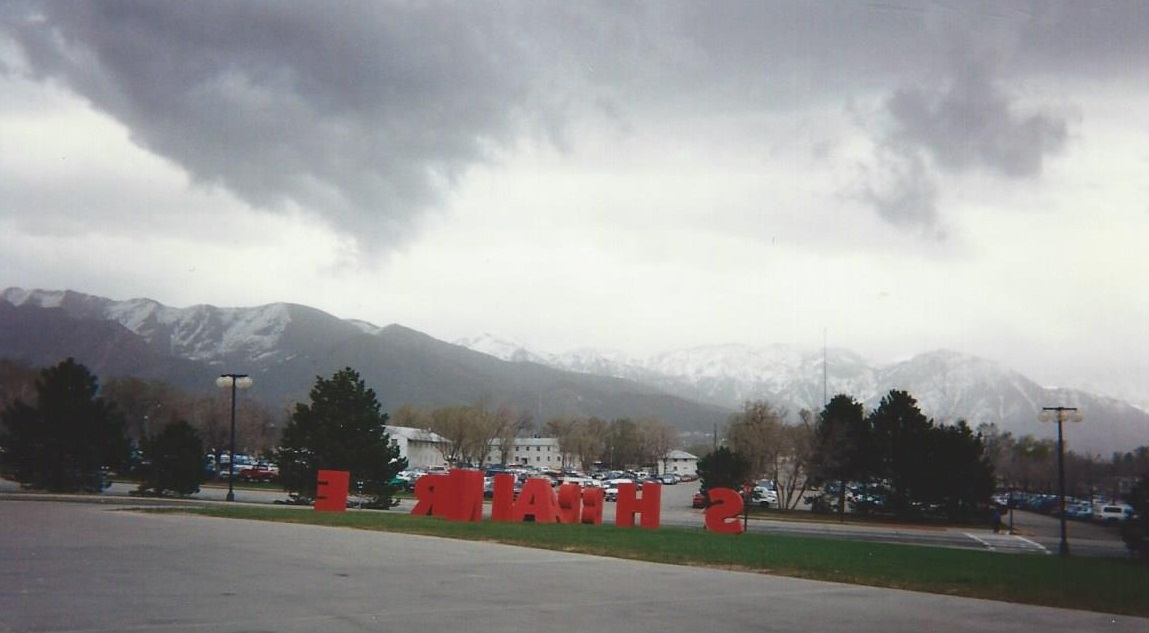
- BrainShare letters on the campus of the University of Utah with the Wasatch Range in the background, March 1995
- Status: Inactive
- Genre: customer and partner technical conference
- Venue: downtown hotels; University of Utah; Salt Palace
- Location: Salt Lake City
- Country: United States
- Inaugurated: 1985
- Most recent: 2014
- Attendance: 5,000–7,000 during peak years
- Organizer: Novell

Novell BrainShare was a technical computer conference sponsored by Novell during the years 1985 through 2014. It was held annually in Salt Lake City, Utah, most often in March of each year, and typically lasted for much of a week. During its early years it was held in a hotel; then for much of the 1990s the conference was held on the campus of the University of Utah; finally beginning in 1997 it was held in the Salt Palace Convention Center. During the keynote addresses for the conference, Novell would present its vision of the direction of the computer industry and how its products fit into that direction. There were then many highly technical breakout sessions where Novell technologies were explained in detail and customers and partners could engage Novell engineers regarding them. Typically some 5,000 to 7,000 attendees came to each BrainShare.

== Aims ==
The goal of BrainShare was to spread the company's message and inform its users and partners as to the capabilities and technical characteristics of its products and of networking in general. As one publication said, "Novell holds its annual BrainShare conference to help refocus attention on the company, its goals and objectives for the upcoming year, and its networking technologies."

Novell would use BrainShare to help introduce new technologies or acquisitions, such as UnixWare or AppWare, to its base audience. One of the more memorable instances of this was the introduction of the NetWare 386 product at the 1989 event where, as Byte magazine later described it, two demonstrations of the new version's capabilities "brought the crowd to its feet cheering."

Once Novell's fortunes began a downhill slide in the mid-1990s, especially under pressure from Microsoft Windows NT, BrainShare was used to showcase new approaches that were intended to turn things around.

== History ==
Novell's product history can be seen in the volumes of presentation books handed out at BrainShare '95.

The conference first took place in 1985. The 1986 event was held over three days in February and was billed as the second annual NetWare Affiliates conference. The venue was a Sheraton Hotel in Downtown Salt Lake City and there were some 150 attendees.

The new few instances of the conference continued to be held over three days in Salt Lake City in February, and were used to introduce or preview new Novell technologies. The 1987 instance was called the Netware Affiliates Third Annual Developers Conference, while for 1988 the name was given as the Fourth Annual Novell Developers Conference. The first conference to be known by the name BrainShare appears to be that held in 1992.

By 1991, the conference has grown in size considerably, with some 1,200 attendees expected. Accordingly, during much of the 1990s the conference was held on the campus of the University of Utah, in the hills overlooking the rest of Salt Lake City, around the third week of March of each year, during the school's spring break. This shift appears to have taken place by the 1991 event.

On the campus, talks for large numbers of attendees were held in the Huntsman Center indoor arena, while ones for smaller numbers were held in other buildings on campus. Attendees were placed into hotels across the city, with Novell providing shuttle buses to take attendees from those hotels to the conference site.

Beginning with BrainShare '97, the conference was no longer on the university campus, but instead was held in the recently opened Salt Palace Convention Center in downtown Salt Lake. In these years the event was organized in a more conventional manner around a trade show floor. The date of the conference could vary more and in 2003 it was held in April rather than March.

Attendance at BrainShare varied from year to year, but for the most part once the conference was fully established it was in the 5,000 to 7,000 range. Attendees came from many countries around the world, in one instance being stated as coming from 60 countries.

== Structure ==
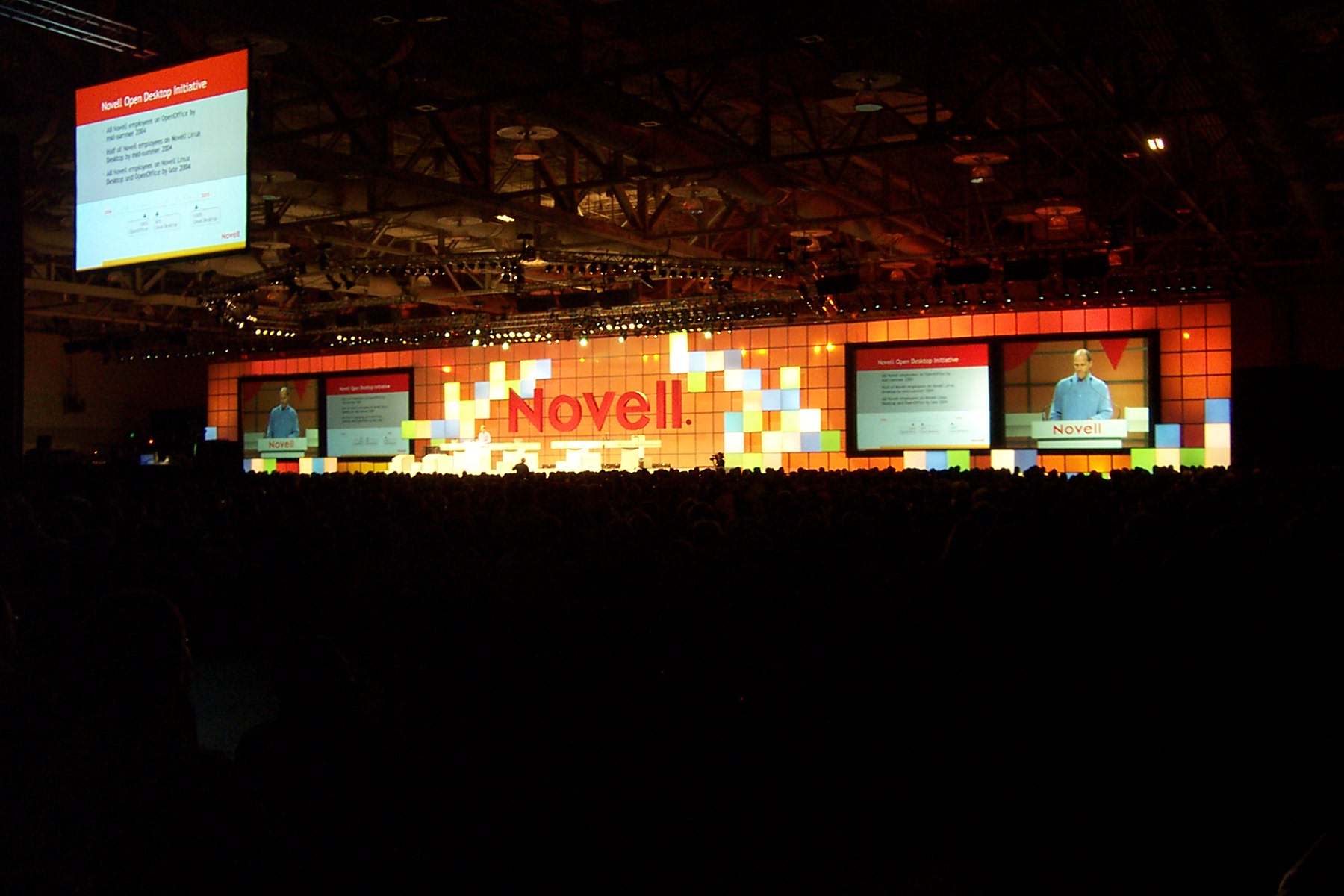
Keynote session at BrainShare 2004 at the Salt Palace

BrainShare typically lasted for much of a week, such as Sunday through Friday. Each day of BrainShare would start with one or more keynote addresses. One address during the week would be from Novell's CEO of the time. Novell's chief scientist, Drew Major, would usually speak as well. Often outside guests, such as Marc Andreessen or George Gilder, would give their perspective on the future of the industry or the economy. Keynotes would be used to establish the theme of a particular conference, such as "pervasive computing" in 1995, "Smart Global Network" in 1996, or "Rock the Net" in 1997. Ambitious aims would be established, such as 1996's goal of "one billion devices interconnected by NetWare by the year 2000" In some cases keynotes were used to convey humorous themes, such as the propensity of some executives to dress more formally than necessary.

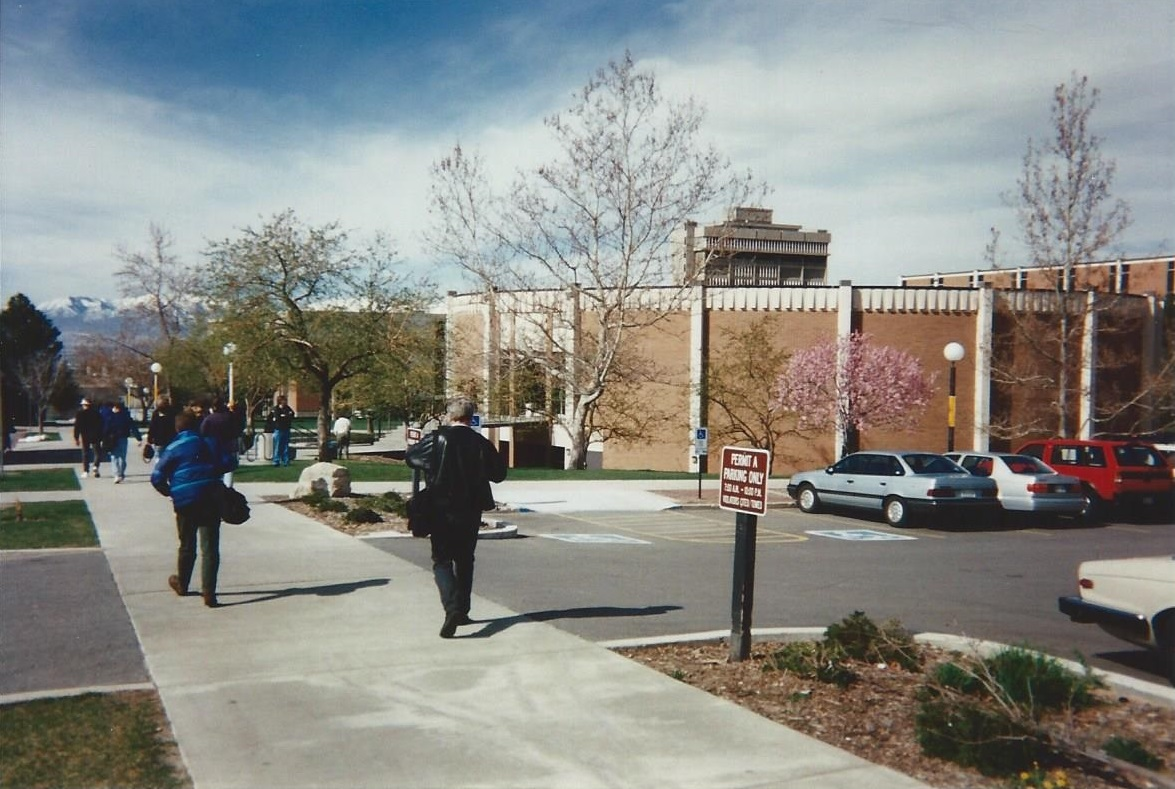
Attendees walking to breakout sessions being held in the University of Utah's Francis Armstrong Madsen Building during BrainShare '95

Technical breakout sessions would follow; typically there were more than 200 of these. As one writer for the Deseret News stated, these were "extremely technical classes and seminars on the intricacies of developing and implementing Novell networks." In some cases, attendees in these sessions could make enhancement suggestions directly to the developers working on a product. Presentation slides for these sessions were made available as printed handouts at the sessions and, in later years, as downloadable files from the Internet. At least one book on administering NetWare found them a valuable resource.

Professionals networking among other attendees was always a main attraction of attending BrainShare. One Novell vice president said in 1996 that BrainShare "is the mind-meld that lets us share our vision and our newest technologies supporting it." Promotional merchandise was given out during the show, always an attraction to some; some items had an obvious tie-in to the conference's name, such as small foam "brains". While some amount of marketing hype was inevitably present during BrainShare, in general the conference kept an emphasis on technical material. Often attendees were passionate about Novell products; one writer termed BrainShare an "annual weeklong lovefest".

Attendees were all kinds of computer professionals, including software architects, software developers, system administrators, IT managers, hardware vendors, systems integrators, consultants, customers, resellers, and service providers. People looked forward to attending BrainShare; one writer termed it his "annual pilgrimage to Salt Lake City".

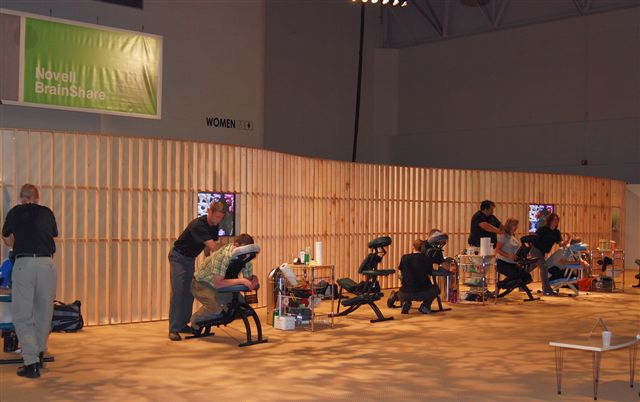
Chair massages being given during BrainShare 2007 in the Salt Palace

Novell's partners would be present at BrainShare. During BrainShare '93, for instance, companies participating in the conference include Microsoft, HP, IBM, WordPerfect, Kodak, Object Design, Lotus Development, and HyperDesk. In some cases these included ones that were Novell competitors, such as Microsoft, following Novell founder Ray Noorda's dictum of "coopetition". Partners were often listed by level of support, such as Platinum Sponsor.

Networking was set up by Novell to allow attendees to join whatever the latest networking technology was at that time. Demonstration rooms, often with names such as the BrainShare Solutions Lab, were constructed for the conference by Novell to allow attendees to see hands-on examples of Novell's latest products and technology.

Evening activities would often take place in downtown Salt Lake. Although Salt Lake was not as glamorous as some other convention city destinations, the Wasatch Range provided a scenic backdrop that many attendees found rewarding. Once the conference was in the Salt Palace, evening concerts by name acts were given at the official conference party, such as by Huey Lewis and the News in 2003 and Collective Soul in 2008.

The conference was beneficial to the local economy; for instance, BrainShare '95 was said to bring some $4.2 million in revenue to Salt Lake City.

== Final years ==
In late 2008, after more than 20 years of the conference, Novell announced that BrainShare 2009 would be canceled. The company attributed the decision to customers and partners having reduced travel budgets in the wake of the global recession of 2008–2009.

In September 2009, Novell announced that BrainShare would return to Salt Lake City in March 2010. So it did, although attendance was down significantly from historical levels, to around 2,000 people.

Novell announced in November 2010 that it had agreed to be acquired by software conglomerate The Attachmate Group.

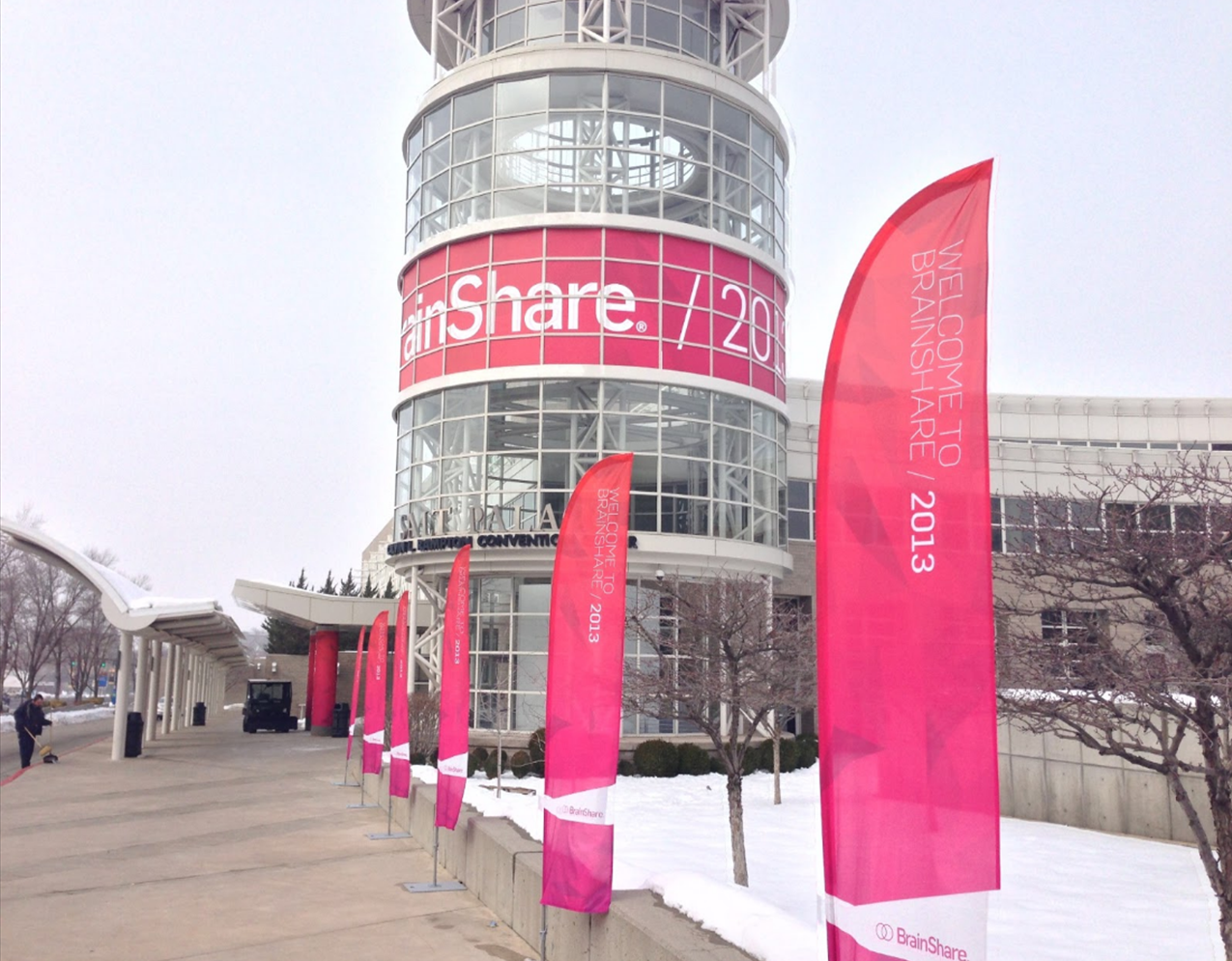
Welcome signs for BrainShare 2013 at the Salt Palace

At this point, BrainShare went onto an 18-month cycle rather than being held yearly. Thus, BrainShare 2011 was held in October of that year, and covered products from the Novell, NetIQ, and SUSE product groups. No BrainShare fell into 2012, as BrainShare 2013 was held in February 2013.

In September 2014, mainframe software company Micro Focus announced it was buying Attachmate Group, including Novell.

The deal had not yet closed when BrainShare 2014 took place in November 2014. By this time attendance was down to 1,200 people, and there was a feeling among some observers that the Salt Palace venue was simply too large for the number of people coming to the conference. The length of the conference was also a couple of days shorter than it had been at its peak; as one writer said, "modern BrainShares suffer [by] comparison to the old mega-events." In any case, during the opening keynote Micro Focus executives spoke optimistically about the effects of the upcoming acquisition, and there were intimations that there would be more BrainShare conferences after this one.

On Micro Focus forums a number of people have lamented the conference's disappearance.

== BrainShare UK ==
In the 1990s Salford Computing Services at the University of Salford struck a long-term licensing deal to make Novell (predominantly NetWare) site licences available to universities and other higher educational institutions within the UK. This was very successful, and an annual technical conference was held at the university which Novell fully endorsed and supported. The conference was originally known as the Novell UK Academic Conference, but in later years was known as BrainShare UK.
