= NetWare Core Protocol =

Network protocol

The NetWare Core Protocol (NCP) is a network protocol used in some products from Novell, Inc. It is usually associated with the client-server operating system Novell NetWare which originally supported primarily MS-DOS client stations, but later support for other platforms such as Microsoft Windows, the classic Mac OS, Linux, Windows NT, Mac OS X, and various flavors of Unix was added.

The NCP is used to access file, print, directory, clock synchronization, messaging, remote command execution and other network service functions. It originally took advantage of an easy network configuration and small memory footprint of the IPX/SPX protocol stack. Since 1991 the TCP/IP implementation is available.

Novell eDirectory uses NCP for synchronizing data changes between the servers in a directory service tree.

== Technical information ==
The original IPX/SPX server implementation was provided only for Novell NetWare platform and now is obsolete. The TCP/IP implementation uses TCP/UDP port 524 and relies on SLP for name resolution.

For NCP operation in IPX/SPX networks the bare IPX protocol was used with Packet Type field set to 17. On the workstation (client station) side the IPX socket number of 0x4003 was used, on the server side the socket number of 0x0451.

The NCP PDU has the following structure:

Octets	Field
2	NCP type
1	Sequence Number
1	Connection Number, lower octet
1	Task Number
1	Connection Number, higher octet
1	Completion Code (only in Reply packet)
1	Connection Status (only in Reply packet)
var	Data

The NCP Type field determines the type of operation:

Value	Meaning
0x1111	Create a Service Connection
0x2222	Service Request
0x3333	Service Reply
0x5555	Destroy Service Connection
0x7777	Burst Mode Transfer
0x9999	Request Being Processed (Server Busy)

Individual requests are identified by the Sequence Number (modulo 256). The Connection Number identifies an individual client station connection on the server. Novell Netware servers of version up to 2.x supported up to 255 connections and the Connection Number occupied only 1 octet. Later it was extended to 2 octets. Task number has value 3 in requests and 1 in replies. The Data field starts with NCP Function number octet which distinguishes individual services.

Number	Function
0	Login User Object
1	Change User Password
2	Map User to Station Set
3	Map Object to Number
4	Map Number to Object
5	Get Station's Logged Information
8	Map Number to Group Name
9	Get Member Set M of Group G
10	Enter Login Area
12	Verify Network Serial Number
13	Log Network Message
14	Get Disk Utilization
15	Scan File Information
16	Set File Information
17	Get File Server Information
18	Get Network Serial Number
19	Get Internet Address
20	Login Object
21	Get Object Connection List
22	Get Station's Logged Information
23	Get Encryption Key
24	Login Object Encrypted
31	Get Connection List from Object
50	Create Bindery Object
51	Delete Bindery Object
52	Rename Object
53	Get Bindery Object Id
54	Get Bindery Object Name
55	Scan Bindery Object
56	Change Bindery Object Security
57	Create Property
58	Delete Property
59	Change Bindery Property Security
60	Scan Property
61	Read Property Value
62	Write Property Value
63	Verify Bindery Object Password
64	Change Bindery Object Password
65	Add Bindery Object to Set
66	Delete Bindery Object from Set
67	Is Bindery Object In Set?
68	Close Bindery
69	Open Bindery
70	Get Bindery Access Level
71	Sacn Bindery Object Trustee Paths
72	Get Bindery Object Access Level
73	Is Calling Station a Manager?
74	Verify Bindery Object Password Encrypted
75	Change Bindery Object Password Encrypted
76	List Relations of an Object
100	Create Queue
101	Destroy Queue
102	Read Queue Current Status
103	Set Queue Current Status
104	Create Queue Job and File
105	Close File and Start Queue Job
106	Remove Job from Queue
107	Get Queue Job List
108	Read Queue Job Entry
109	Change Queue Job Entry
110	Change Queue Job Position
111	Attach Queue Server to Queue
112	Detach Queue Server from Queue
113	Service Queue Job
114	Finish Servicing Queue Job
115	Abort Servicing Queue Job
116	Change to Client's Rights
117	Restore Queue Server Rights
118	Read Queue Server Current Status
119	Set Queue Server Current Status
120	Get Queue Job Size
150	Get Current Account Status
151	Submit Account Charge
152	Submit Account Hold
153	Submit Account Note
200	Check Console Privileges
201	Get File Server Description Strings
202	Set File Server Date and Time
203	Disable File Server Login
204	Enable File Server Login
205	Get File Server Login Status
206	Purge All Erased Files
207	Disable Transaction Tracking
208	Enable Transaction Tracking
209	Set Console Broadcast
210	Clear Connection Number
211	Down File Server
212	Get File System Statistics
213	TTS Get Statistics
214	Get Disk Cache Statistics
215	Get Drive Mapping Table
216	Get Physical Disk Statistics
217	Get Disk Channel Statistics
218	Get Connection's Task Information
219	Get Connection's Open Files
220	Get Connection's Using a File
221	Get Physical Record Locks by Connection and File
222	Get Physical Record Locks by File
223	Get Logical Records by Connection
224	Get Logical Record Information
225	Get Connection's Semaphores
226	Get Semaphore Information
227	Get LAN Driver's Configuration Information
229	Get Connection's Usage Statistics
230	Get Object's Remaining Disk Space
231	Get File Server LAN I/O Statistics
232	Get File Server Misc Information
233	Get Volume Information

The contents and the length of the rest of the Data field depends on the NCP Function.

== Client-side implementations ==
- Novell Client for Windows Vista from Novell.
- Novell Client for Windows 2000/XP/2003 from Novell.
- Novell Client for Windows 95/98 from Novell.
- Novell Client for Linux from Novell.
- NetWare Clients for DOS from Novell - no longer supported.
- NetWare Client for Mac OS X from Prosoft Engineering.
- ncpfs, an open-source NCP client implementation for Linux.
- Client Service for NetWare from Microsoft.
