= Service Advertising Protocol =

The Service Advertising Protocol (SAP) is included in the Internetwork Packet Exchange (IPX) protocol. SAP makes the process of adding and removing services on an IPX internetwork dynamic. SAP was maintained by Novell.

As servers are booted up, they may advertise their services using SAP; when they are brought down, they use SAP to indicate that their services will no longer be available. IPX network servers may use SAP to identify themselves by name and service type. All entities that use SAP must broadcast a name and Service Type that (together) are unique throughout the entire IPX internetwork. This policy is enforced by system administrators and application developers.

== SAP Service Types ==
Value	Meaning
0x0001	User
0x0002	User group
0x0003	Print queue
0x0004	File server
0x0005	Job server
0x0006	Gateway
0x0007	Print server
0x0009	Archive server
0x000A	Job queue
0x000B	Administrative object
0x0021	SNA gateway
0x0024	Remote bridge server
0x0027	TCP/IP gateway
0x0047	Advertising print server
0x8000-0x7FFF	Reserved
0xFFFF	Wildcard
