= Bell–LaPadula model =

Computer security model

The Bell–LaPadula model (BLP) is a state-machine model used for enforcing access control in government and military applications. It was developed by David Elliott Bell, and Leonard J. LaPadula, subsequent to strong guidance from Roger R. Schell, to formalize the U.S. Department of Defense (DoD) multilevel security (MLS) policy. The model is a formal state transition model of computer security policy that describes a set of access control rules which use security labels on objects and clearances for subjects. Security labels range from the most sensitive (e.g., "Top Secret"), down to the least sensitive (e.g., "Unclassified" or "Public").

== Features ==
The Bell–LaPadula model focuses on data confidentiality and controlled access to classified information, in contrast to the Biba Integrity Model which describes rules for the protection of data integrity. In this formal model, the entities in an information system are divided into subjects and objects. The notion of a "secure state" is defined, and it is proven that each state transition preserves security by moving from secure state to secure state, thereby inductively proving that the system satisfies the security objectives of the model. The Bell–LaPadula model is built on the concept of a state machine with a set of allowable states in a computer system. The transition from one state to another state is defined by transition functions. A system state is defined to be "secure" if the only permitted access modes of subjects to objects are in accordance with a security policy. To determine whether a specific access mode is allowed, the clearance of a subject is compared to the classification of the object (more precisely, to the combination of classification and set of compartments, making up the security level) to determine if the subject is authorized for the specific access mode. The clearance/classification scheme is expressed in terms of a partial order. The model defines one discretionary access control (DAC) rule and two mandatory access control (MAC) rules with three security properties:

1. The Simple Security Property states that a subject at a given security level may not read an object at a higher security level.
2. The * (Star) Security Property states that a subject at a given security level may not write to any object at a lower security level.
3. The Discretionary Security Property uses an access matrix to specify the discretionary access control.

The transfer of information from a high-sensitivity document to a lower-sensitivity document may happen in the Bell–LaPadula model via the concept of trusted subjects. Trusted Subjects are not restricted by the Star-property. Trusted Subjects must be shown to be trustworthy with regard to the security policy.

The Bell–LaPadula security model is directed toward access control and is characterized by the phrase "write up, read down" (WURD). Compare the Biba model, the Clark–Wilson model, and the Chinese Wall model.

With Bell–LaPadula, users can create content only at or above their own security level (i.e. secret researchers can create secret or top-secret files but may not create public files; no write-down). Conversely, users can view content only at or below their own security level (i.e. secret researchers can view public or secret files, but may not view top-secret files; no read-up).

The Bell–LaPadula model explicitly defined its scope. It did not treat the following extensively:

- Covert channels. Passing information via pre-arranged actions was described briefly.
- Networks of systems. Later modeling work did address this topic.
- Policies outside multilevel security. Work in the early 1990s showed that MLS is one version of boolean policies, as are all other published policies.

=== Strong Star Property ===
The Strong Star Property is an alternative to the *-Property, in which subjects may write to objects with only a matching security level. Thus, the write-up operation permitted in the usual *-Property is not present, only a write-to-same operation. The Strong Star Property is usually discussed in the context of multilevel database management systems and is motivated by integrity concerns. This Strong Star Property was anticipated in the Biba model where it was shown that strong integrity in combination with the Bell–LaPadula model resulted in reading and writing at a single level.

=== Tranquility principle ===
The tranquility principle of the Bell–LaPadula model states that the classification of a subject or object does not change while it is being referenced. There are two forms to the tranquility principle: the "principle of strong tranquility" states that security levels do not change during the normal operation of the system. The "principle of weak tranquility" states that security levels may never change in such a way as to violate a defined security policy. Weak tranquility is desirable as it allows systems to observe the principle of least privilege. That is, processes start with a low clearance level regardless of their owners clearance, and progressively accumulate higher clearance levels as actions require it.

== Limitations ==
- Only addresses confidentiality, control of writing (one form of integrity), *-property and discretionary access control
- Covert channels are mentioned but are not addressed comprehensively
- The tranquility principle limits its applicability to systems where security levels do not change dynamically. It allows controlled copying from high to low via trusted subjects. [Ed. Not many systems using BLP include dynamic changes to object security levels.]

== See also ==
- Air gap (networking)
- Biba Integrity Model
- Clark–Wilson model
- Discretionary access control – DAC
- Graham–Denning model
- Mandatory access control – MAC
- Multilevel security – MLS
- Purdue Enterprise Reference Architecture
- Security modes
- Take-grant protection model
