= Computer security model =

Plan for specifying and enforcing security policies

A computer security model is a scheme for specifying and enforcing security policies. A security model may be founded upon a formal model of access rights, a model of computation, a model of distributed computing, or no particular theoretical grounding at all. A computer security model is implemented through a computer security policy.

For a more complete list of available articles on specific security models, see Category:Computer security models.

== Selected topics ==
- Access control list (ACL)
- Attribute-based access control (ABAC)
- Bell–LaPadula model
- Biba model
- Brewer and Nash model
- Capability-based security
- Clark-Wilson model
- Context-based access control (CBAC)
- Graham-Denning model
- Harrison-Ruzzo-Ullman (HRU)
- High-water mark (computer security)
- Lattice-based access control (LBAC)
- Mandatory access control (MAC)
- Multi-level security (MLS)
- Non-interference (security)
- Object-capability model
- Protection ring
- Relationship-based access control (ReBAC)
- Role-based access control (RBAC)
- Take-grant protection model
- Discretionary access control (DAC)

== See also ==
- Security modes
- Protection mechanism
