= Remote access policy =

Access control document

In cybersecurity, a remote access policy is a document that specifies the security requirements and conditions under which remote (off‑site) connections to an organization’s internal network are permitted. They are important for organizations with geographically dispersed users or connections extending into potentially insecure environments (public or home networks), and help ensure that access is controlled, secure, and used only for legitimate business purposes.

A remote access policy defines standards for connecting to the organizational network and security standards for computers that are allowed to connect to the organizational network. It also defines acceptable methods of remote connection (such as encrypted VPN access), user responsibilities, authentication and access controls, and measures to protect the network and data from unauthorized or insecure access. It should cover all available methods to remotely access internal resources:

- dial-in (SLIP, PPP)
- ISDN/Frame Relay
- telnet access from Internet
- Cable modem

== See also ==
- Network security policy
- Computer security policy
- User account policy
- Internet security
- Computer security
- Network security
- Industrial espionage
- Information security
