= National Cyber Security Hall of Fame =

- Respect the past, Protect the future
- Established: 2012
- Location: Baltimore, Maryland
- Number of inductees: 51
- Director: Larry Letow
- Website: www.cybersecurityhalloffame.org

The National Cyber Security Hall of Fame, founded by Larry Letow and Rick Geritz, was established in 2012 to recognize the contributions of key individuals in the field of cyber security; its mission statement is "Respect the Past – Protect the Future". According to its website, it is designed to honor the innovative individuals and organizations which had the vision and leadership to create the fundamental building blocks for the cybersecurity Industry. The organization also highlights major milestones in the industry's 40-year history through a timeline representation, which includes inductees and their corresponding accomplishments.

== Nominations ==
Nominations into the Cyber Security Hall of Fame are submitted in the following categories, then reviewed by the advisory committee, chaired in 2013 by Mike Jacobs.

- Technology
- Policy
- Public Awareness
- Education
- Business
- Infrastructure
- Public Private Partnerships

== Founders ==
Larry Letow (Chairperson), CEO US, CyberCX, and Rick Geritz, CEO, MyJourney

== Advisory board ==
As of 2019, the members of the Cyber Security Hall of Fame advisory board are:

1. Mike Jacobs – chairman of the National Cyber Security Hall of Fame
2. Jim Bidzos – chief executive officer and chairman of VeriSign, Inc.
3. Donna F. Dodson – chief cyber security advisor for the National Institute of Standards and Technology
4. Cynthia E. Irvine – distinguished professor of computer science at the Naval Postgraduate School
5. Charles Kolodgy – senior security strategist for IBM
6. Gordon W. Romney – professor of cyber security at the University of San Diego
7. John Serafini – venture capital investor
8. Eugene H. Spafford – professor of computer science at Purdue University

== Hall of Fame Class of 2012 ==
- F. Lynn McNulty – an early champion of information security in the U.S. Government
- Martin Hellman – professor emeritus at Stanford University
- Ralph Merkle – developed the earliest public key cryptography system with Diffie and Hellman
- Whitfield Diffie – developed the world's earliest public key cryptographic system along with Merkle and Hellman
- Dorothy Denning – one of the world's leading experts in information security
- Roger R. Schell – president of ESec, providing platforms for secure e-business on the Internet
- Peter G. Neumann – principal scientist at SRI International
- Carl Landwehr – lead research scientist at the Cyber Security and Policy Institute of George Washington University
- Ronald Rivest – professor of computer science at MIT's EECS Department
- Adi Shamir – professor of mathematics and computer science at the Weizmann Institute
- Leonard Adleman – professor of computer science and molecular biology at the University of Southern California

== Hall of Fame Class of 2013 ==
- David Elliott Bell – coauthor of the Bell–LaPadula model of computer security
- Jim Bidzos – chief executive officer and chairman of VeriSign, Inc
- Eugene H. Spafford – professor of computer science at Purdue University
- James P. Anderson – started the field of intrusion detection and organized the CIA group known as "The Brain Trust"
- Willis H. Ware – computer scientist emeritus at the RAND Corporation

== Hall of Fame Class of 2014 ==
- Steven M. Bellovin – professor of computer science at Columbia University
- Vinton G. Cerf – vice-president and chief internet evangelist for Google
- Richard A. Clarke – former special advisor to the president on Cyber Security
- Paul Kocher – designer of SSL3 cryptographic elements
- Philip Zimmermann – creator of Pretty Good Privacy (PGP)

== Hall of Fame Class of 2015 ==
- Cynthia E. Irvine – distinguished professor of computer science at the Naval Postgraduate School
- Susan Landau – professor of cyber security and policy at Tufts University's Fletcher School of Law and Diplomacy
- Steven B. Lipner – retired director of software security at Microsoft
- Ronald S. Ross – National Institute of Standards and Technology Fellow
- Jerome H. Saltzer – professor emeritus of computer science at MIT

== Hall of Fame Class of 2016 ==
- Horst Feistel – inventor of the Data Encryption Standard
- Dan Geer – chief information security officer at In-Q-Tel
- Lance J. Hoffman – distinguished research professor of computer science at George Washington University
- Paul A. Karger – inventor and security architect at the Digital Equipment Corporation and at IBM
- Butler Lampson – technical fellow at Microsoft and adjunct professor of computer science at MIT
- William H. Murray – founder of the Colloquium for Information System Security Education (CISSE)
- Leonard J. LaPadula – coauthor of the Bell–LaPadula model of computer security

== Hall of Fame Class of 2019 ==
(There was no Class of Inductees in 2017 or 2018.)

- Brian Snow – retired technical director of research in the NSA's Information Assurance Directorate
- Sheila Brand – main author of the Trusted Computer System Evaluation Criteria
- Corey Schou – professor of informatics at Idaho State University and director of its Information Assurance Training and Education Center
- Virgil D. Gligor – professor of electrical and computer engineering at Carnegie Mellon University
- Kenneth Minihan – former director of the NSA and of the Defense Intelligence Agency
- Rebecca Bace – pioneer in the field of intrusion detection, worked for the NSA and later in the high-tech private sector
- Howard Schmidt – created the first U.S. government computer forensics lab, served as White House cybersecurity adviser in the Bush and Obama Administrations

== Hall of Fame Class of 2023 ==
- Matthew Bishop – professor, University of California at Davis
- Renaud Deraison – founder of Tenable
- Dave Dewalt – founder and CEO, NightDragon
- Ron Gula – founder of Tenable
- Jack Huffard – founder of Tenable
- Mike Jacobs – retired assurance director, National Security Agency
- Diana Kelley – CISO, Protect AI
- Tony Sager – senior VP and chief evangelist, Center for Internet Security
- Mark Weatherford – former chief strategy officer, National Cybersecurity Center
- Sounil Yu – co-founder and CTO, Knostic
- CompTia – non-profit trade association that issues professional certifications for Cyber

== Hall of Fame Class of 2024 ==
- Edna Conway – former CSO for Cisco – global value chain and current cyber subject matter expert
- Dr. Paul Nielsen – currently CEO of Carnegie Mellon University's Software Engineering Institute
- Alan Paller – former president SANS Technology Institute
- Admiral Michael Rogers – second commander of the United States Cyber Command and 17th director of the National Security Agency
- Dr. James Roskind – former VP, chief scientist of Netscape and current vice president of Amazon
- Heather Rodriguez – chief executive officer and founder of Security Innovation Network (SINET)
- Robert Rodriguez – chairperson and founder of Security Innovation Network (SINET)

Here is a link to the honoree dinner celebration on Dec 5, 2024... https://www.youtube.com/watch?v=sa5l8ddqX1A&t=928s

== See also ==
- List of computer-related awards
