= Protection =

Measures taken to guard against damage

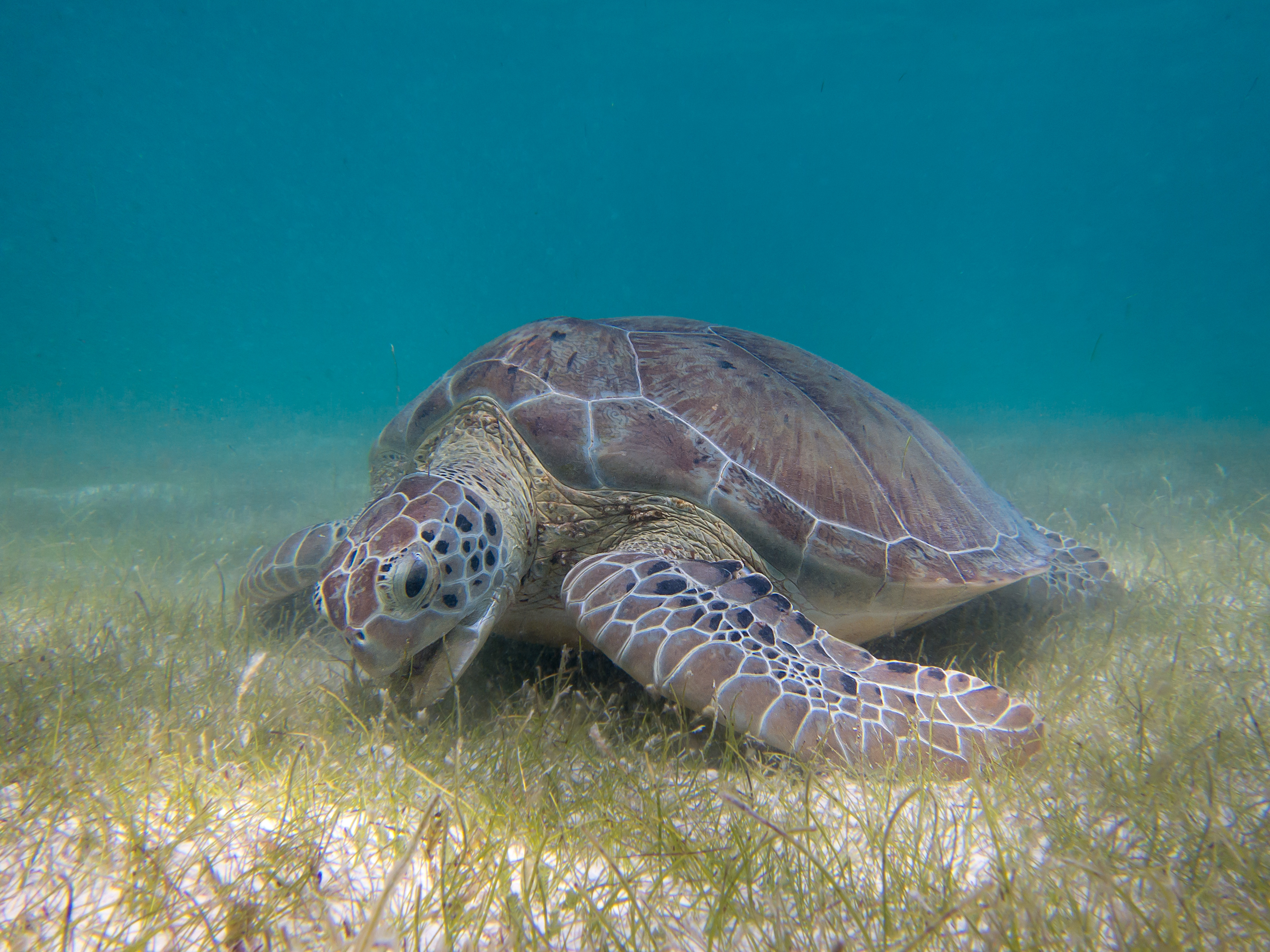
The shell of a sea turtle provides protection from predators.

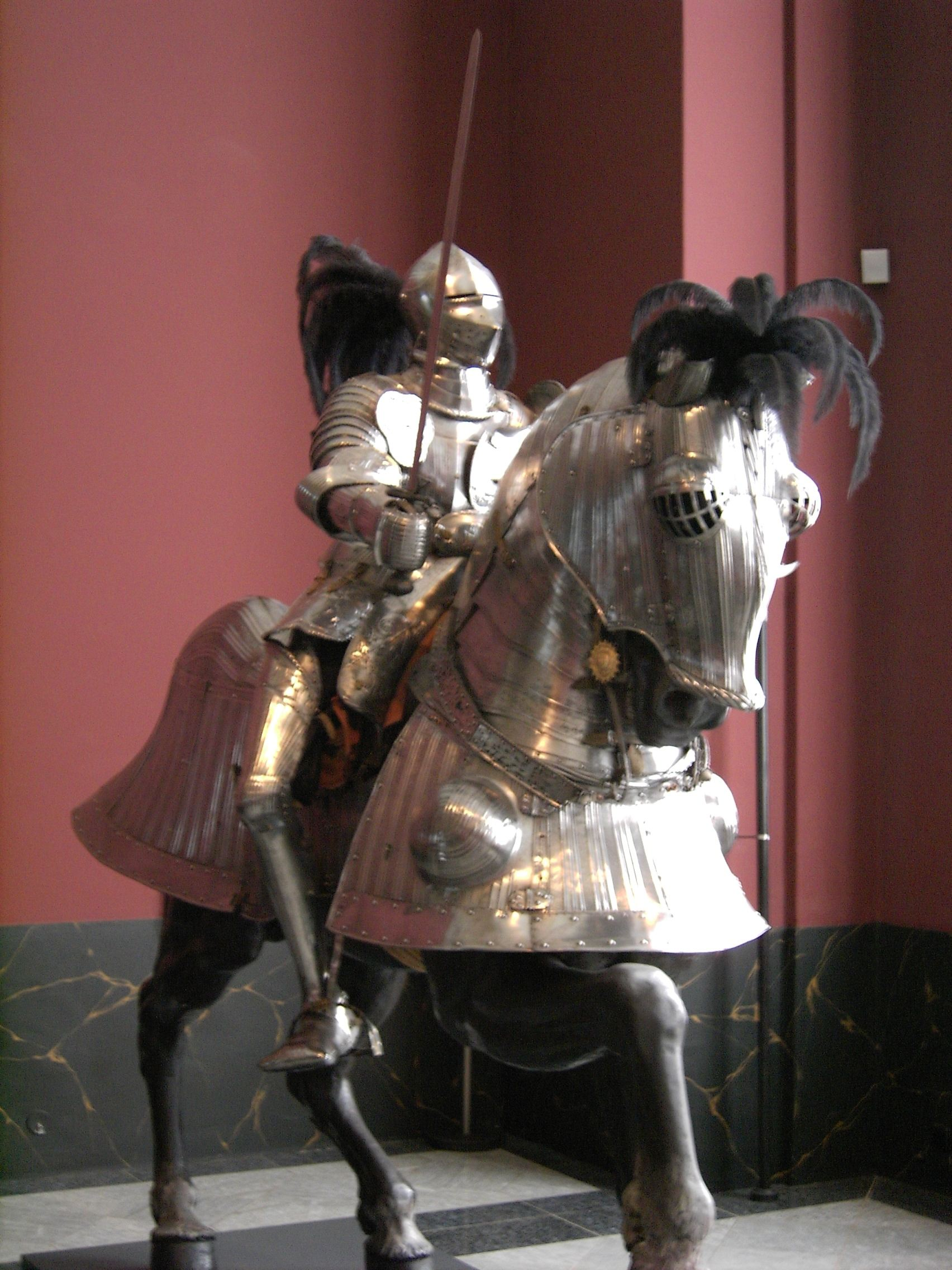
A suit of armor, crafted for a knight and their mount to wear as protection from potential enemies.

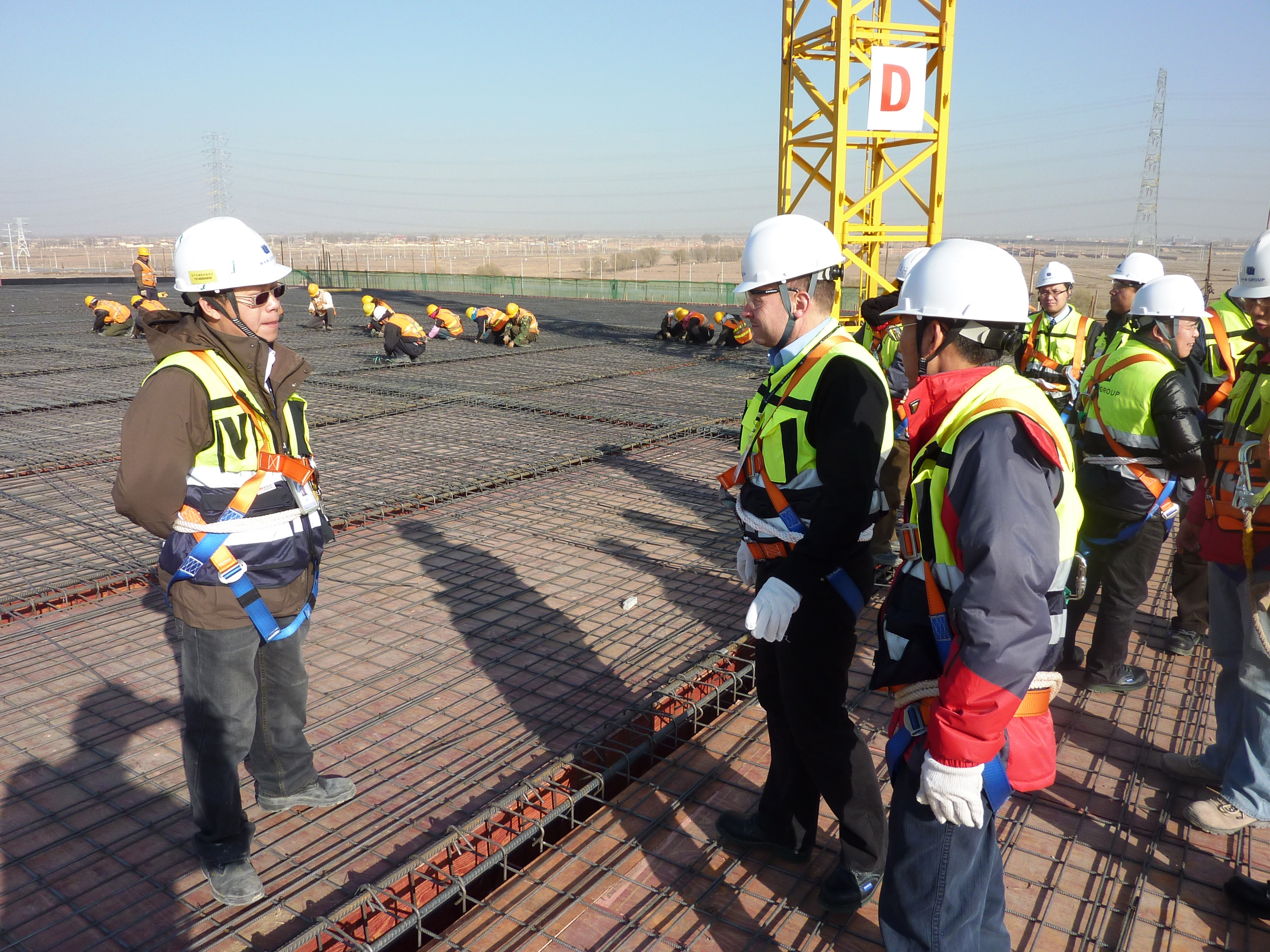
Safety equipment and supervisor instructions at a construction site to provide protection to workers.

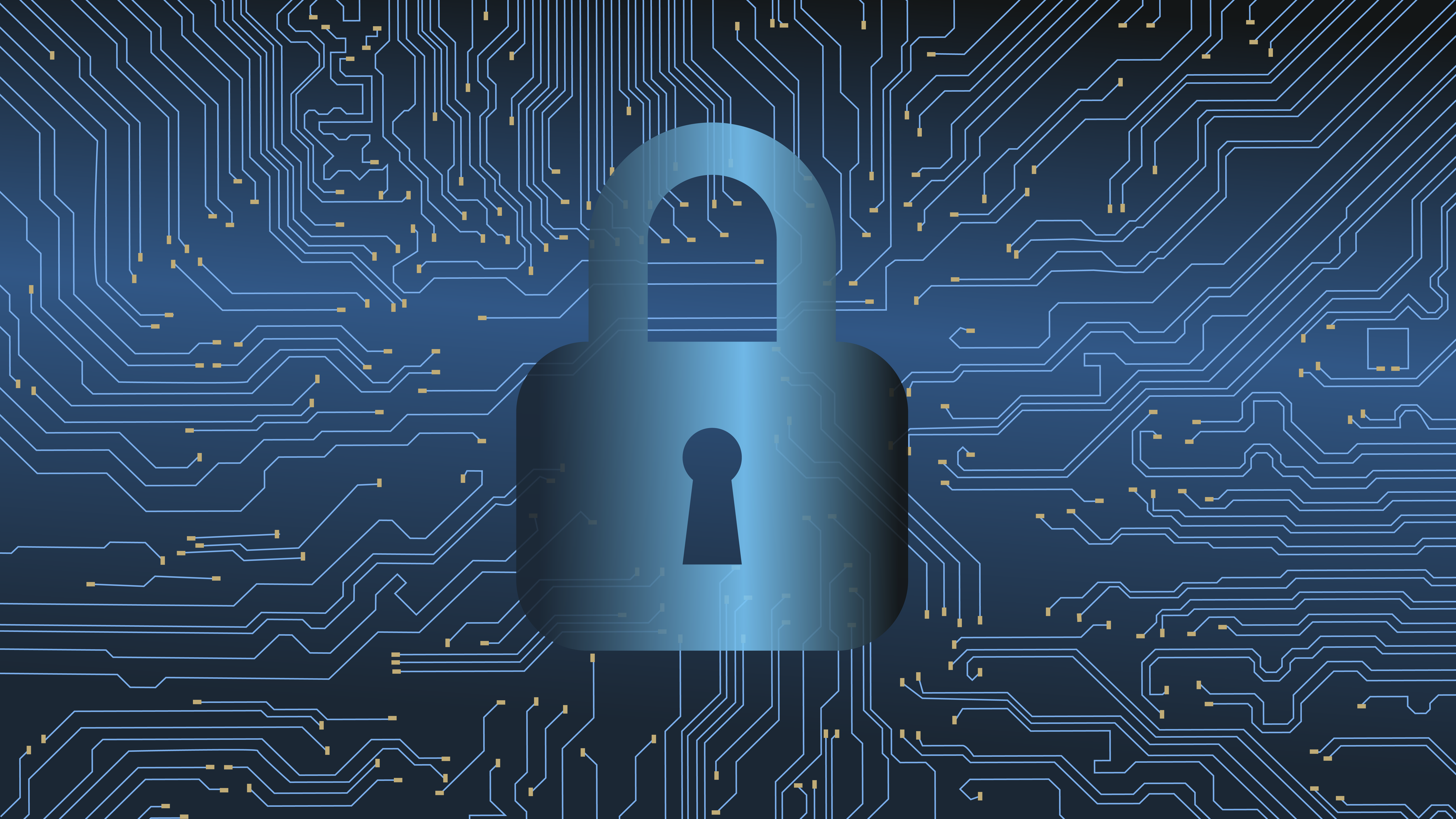
The image of a padlock superimposed over a circuit board pattern symbolizes internal protections in a computer system.

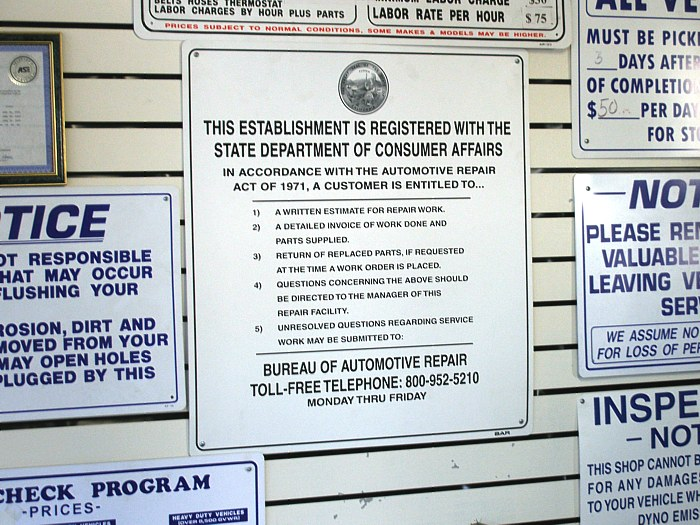
Consumer protection laws often mandate the posting of informative notices, such as this one which appears in automotive repair shops in California.

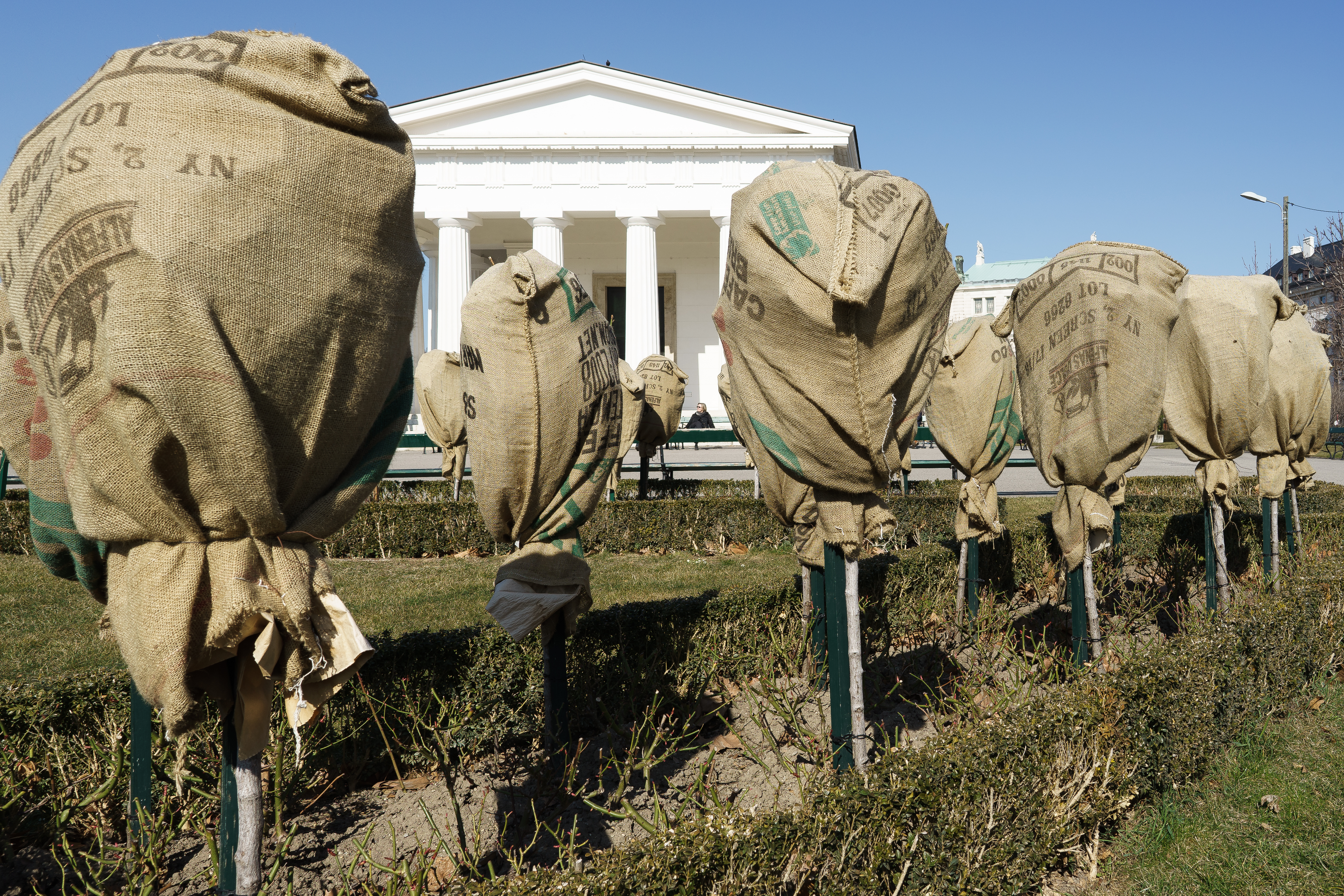
Roses with protection against freezing - Volksgarten, Vienna

Protection is any measure taken to guard something against damage caused by outside forces. Protection can be provided to physical objects, including organisms, to systems, and to intangible things like civil and political rights. Although the mechanisms for providing protection vary widely, the basic meaning of the term remains the same. This is illustrated by an explanation found in a manual on electrical wiring:

The meaning of the word protection, as used in the electrical industry, is no different to that in everyday use. People protect themselves against personal or financial loss by means of insurance as well as from injury or discomfort by the use of protective clothing. They further protect their property by the installation of security measures such as locks and/or alarm systems.

Some kind of protection is a characteristic of all life, as living things have evolved at least some protective mechanisms to counter damaging environmental phenomena, such as ultraviolet light. Biological membranes such as bark on trees and skin on animals offer protection from various threats, with skin playing a key role in protecting organisms against pathogens and excessive water loss. Additional structures like scales and hair offer further protection from the elements and from predators, with some animals having features such as spines or camouflage serving exclusively as anti-predator adaptations. Many animals supplement the protection afforded by their physiology by burrowing or otherwise adopting habitats or behaviors that insulate them from potential sources of harm. Humans originally began wearing clothing and building shelters in prehistoric times for protection from the elements. Both humans and animals are also often concerned with the protection of others, with adult animals being particularly inclined to seek to protect their young from elements of nature and from predators.

In the human sphere of activity, the concept of protection has been extended to nonliving objects, including technological systems such as computers, and to intangible things such as intellectual property, beliefs, and economic systems. Humans seek to protect locations of historical and cultural significance through historic preservation efforts, and are also concerned with protecting the environment from damage caused by human activity, and with protecting the Earth as a whole from potentially harmful objects from space.

== Physical protection ==
=== Protection of objects ===
- Fire protection, including passive fire protection measures such as physical firewalls and fireproofing, and active fire protection measures, such as fire sprinkler systems.
- Waterproofing, though application of surface layers that repel water.
- Rot-proofing and rustproofing
- Thermal conductivity resistance
- Impact resistance
- Radiation protection, protection of people and the environment from radiation
- Dust resistance
- Conservation and restoration of immovable cultural property, including a large number of techniques to preserve sites of historical or archaeological value

=== Protection of persons ===
- Close protection, physical protection and security from danger of very important persons
- Climbing protection, safety measures in climbing
- Diplomatic protection
- Humanitarian protection, the protection of civilians, in conflict zones and other humanitarian crises
- Journalism source protection
- Personal protective equipment
- Safe sex practices to afford sexual protection against pregnancy and disease, particularly the use of condoms
- Executive protection, security measures taken to ensure the safety of important persons
- Protection racket, a criminal scheme involving exchanging money from "protection" against violence
- Right of asylum, protection for those seeking asylum from persecution by political groups and to ensure safe passage
- Workplace or employment retaliation, protecting individuals in the workplace such as from being fired for opposing, aiding and complaining about workplace practices

== Protection of systems ==
=== Protection of technological systems ===
Protection of technological systems is often symbolized by the use of a padlock icon, such as "🔒", or a padlock image.

- Protection mechanism, in computer science. In computer sciences the separation of protection and security is a design choice. William Wulf has identified protection as a mechanism and security as a policy.
- Power-system protection, in power engineering
- A way of encapsulation in object-oriented programming
- Copy protection, measures to enforce copyright by preventing the reproduction of software, films, music, and other media.
- Write protection, a mechanism that prevents writing, modifying, or erasing data on a device

=== Protection of ecological systems ===
- Environmental protection, the practice of protecting the natural environment

=== Protection of social systems ===
- Consumer protection, laws governing sales and credit practices involving the public.
- Protectionism, an economic policy of protecting a country's market from competitors.
- Protection of rights, with respect to civil and political rights.
- Data protection through information privacy measures.
- Intellectual property protection.

== See also ==
- Safety
- Security
