= Susan L. Graham =

American computer scientist

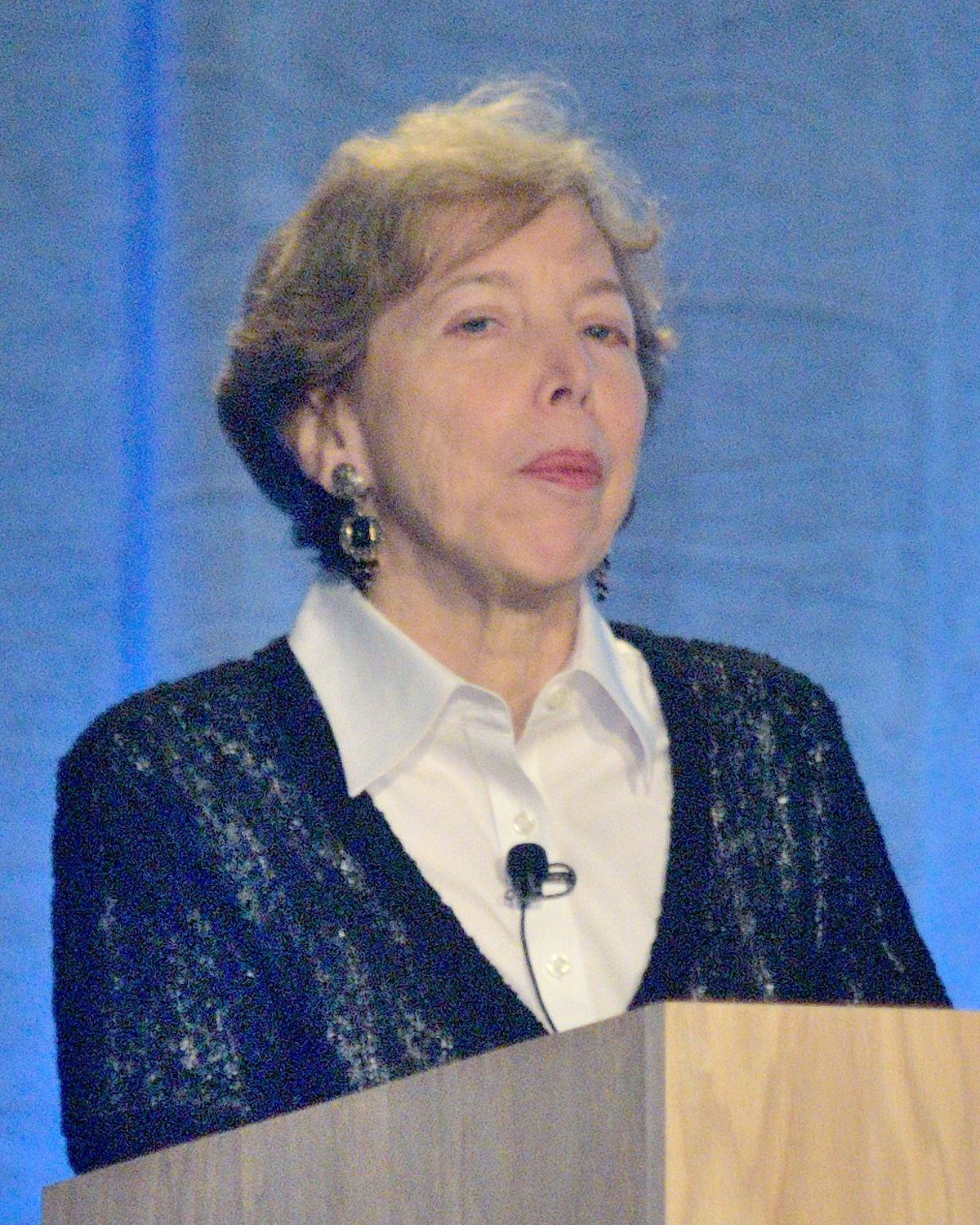
- Graham in 2012
- Born: Susan Lois Graham; September 16, 1942 (age 84); Cleveland, Ohio, U.S.
- Education: A.B. Harvard; M.S., Ph.D. Stanford
- Awards: ACM Fellow; ACM Ken Kennedy Award; IEEE Fellow; IEEE von Neumann Medal; Fellow of the AAAS
- Scientific career
- Fields: Computer science
- Workplaces: University of California, Berkeley
- Thesis: Precedence Languages and Bounded Right Context Languages (1971)
- Doctoral advisor: David Gries
- Other academic advisors: Niklaus Wirth
- Doctoral students: David F. Bacon; M. Kirk McKusick; Mark N. Wegman
- Website: www.cs.berkeley.edu/~graham

Susan Lois Graham (born September 16, 1942) is an American computer scientist. Graham is the Pehong Chen Distinguished Professor Emerita in the Computer Science Division of the Department of Electrical Engineering and Computer Sciences at the University of California, Berkeley.

== Education and professional career ==
Born in Cleveland, Graham received her A.B. in mathematics from Harvard in 1964. She did her graduate work in computer science at Stanford, receiving her M.S. in 1966 and her Ph.D. in 1971 under the supervision of David Gries. In 1971 she joined the faculty of the University of California, Berkeley, rising from assistant professor (1971–1976), through associate professor (1976–1981) to full professor from 1981 onwards.

Graham's research projects include:

- Harmonia – A language-based framework for interactive software development.
- Titanium - A Java-based parallel programming language, compiler, and runtime system.

Graham was the founding editor of the ACM Transactions on Programming Languages and Systems. Graham has published dozens of research articles and has lectured and published extensively on subjects in computer languages, compilers and programming environments.

She is a member of the United States President's Council of Advisors on Science and Technology. Among other activities, she chaired the Panel on Open Source Software for High End Computing.

Graham has long been involved with Harvard, culminating with her joining the Harvard Corporation in 2011.

== Honors and awards ==
She was elected a member of the National Academy of Engineering in 1993 for contributions to the theory and practice of compiler construction and for leadership in the computer science community.

In 1994 she was inducted as a Fellow of the Association for Computing Machinery. She is also a Fellow of the American Association for the Advancement of Science, the American Academy of Arts and Sciences, and the Institute of Electrical and Electronics Engineers (IEEE).

In 2004, her paper on Gprof appeared on the list of the 50 most influential PLDI papers of all time as one of four papers of 1982 year.

In 2009, she was awarded the IEEE John von Neumann Medal for "contributions to programming language design and implementation and for exemplary service to the discipline of computer science".

On Sept. 29, 2011 it was announced that she had been chosen to receive the ACM-IEEE-CS Ken Kennedy Award on November 15, 2011 in Seattle at SC11, the international conference on high-performance computing.

Graham is featured in the Notable Women in Computing cards.

== Personal life ==
Graham was married to professor emeritus Michael A. Harrison of UC Berkeley.

== See also ==
- List of computer scientists
