= Carl Landwehr =

American computer scientist

Carl E. Landwehr
- Born: Evanston, Illinois
- Citizenship: American
- Education: Yale; University of Michigan
- Known for: Information Security; Cybersecurity
- Awards: National Cyber Security Hall of Fame Inductee (2012); IEEE Fellow (2013); Computing Research Association Distinguished Service Award (2025)
- Scientific career
- Fields: Computer science
- Workplaces: Merit Network; Naval Research Laboratory; Mitretek Systems; National Science Foundation; University of Maryland; IARPA; George Washington University; University of Michigan
- Thesis: Load Sharing in Computer Networks: A Queueing Model (1974)
- Doctoral advisor: Bernard A. Galler
- Website: http://www.landwehr.org

Carl E. Landwehr is an American computer scientist whose research focus is cybersecurity and trustworthy computing. His work has addressed the identification of software vulnerabilities toward high assurance software development, architectures for intrusion-tolerant and multilevel security systems, token-based authentication, and system evaluation and certification methods. In an invited essay for ACSAC 2013, he proposed the idea of developing building codes for building software that is used in critical infrastructures. He has organized an NSF funded workshop to develop a building code and research agenda for medical device software security. The final committee report is available through the Cyber Security and Policy Institute of the George Washington University, and the building code through the IEEE.

Carl Landwehr has developed and led cybersecurity research programs at the National Science Foundation (2001–2004, 2009–2011), IARPA (2005–2009), Mitretek Systems and the Naval Research Laboratory (1982–1999). From 2007 to 2010, he served as editor-in-chief of IEEE Security & Privacy Magazine as well as associate editor of several IEEE journals. He was a member of DARPA's Information Science and Technology Study Group and has served on several studies for the National Academy of Sciences. Research begun while visiting at the Isaac Newton Institute at Cambridge eventually led to the development of a patent for a secure identification system held by Dr. Landwehr and Daniel Latham. He is the author of several highly cited publications.

Carl Landwehr holds degrees from Yale University (BS) and the University of Michigan (MS, PhD). While at Michigan, he worked for the Merit Network, currently the longest running regional computer network in the United States. He has taught and lectured widely, including at Purdue University, Georgetown University, Virginia Tech University, and the University of Maryland. He was a lead research scientist at the Cyber Security Policy and Research Institute at George Washington University. In 2015 and 2016, Dr. Landwehr was the visiting McDevitt Professor of Computer Science at the McDevitt Center for Creativity and Innovation of LeMoyne College to develop and teach an inter-disciplinary undergraduate course entitled "Cybersecurity for Future Presidents". In 2019, he became a visiting professor in the Electrical and Computer Engineering Division of the University of Michigan in Ann Arbor. Dr. Landwehr served on the Board of Directors of the Center for Democracy and Technology from September 2016 to April 2025.

Carl Landwehr was interviewed by Gary McGraw of Cigital for the Silver Bullet podcasts on Security for IEEE discussing changing threats in cybersecurity. He has also been interviewed for the computer history series hosted by the Charles Babbage Institute of the University of Minnesota. For the 30th Anniversary IEEE Symposium on Security and Privacy, he provided a history of U.S. Government investments in cyber security research.

Dr. Landwehr is an IEEE Fellow (2013) and has received various awards, including the ACM SIGSAC's Outstanding Contribution Award (2013) and the National Science Foundation Director's Award for Meritorious Service (2012). He was a member of the founding class (2012) inducted into the National Cyber Security Hall of Fame. In 2025, the Board of Directors of the Computing Research Association (CRA) selected Carl Landwehr to receive the CRA Distinguished Service Award, recognizing "...his pioneering contributions to cybersecurity research and his leadership in shaping national research programs."
