= Impossibility theorem =

Impossibility theorem could refer to:

- Proof of impossibility, a negative proof of a theory
- Arrow's impossibility theorem in welfare economics
