= Michael A. Harrison =

American computer scientist

- Born: 1935 or 1936; Philadelphia, PA, U.S.A.
- Died: June 7, 2025 (aged 89)
- Education: University of Michigan
- Known for: formal language theory, Harrison-Ruzzo-Ullman model
- Scientific career
- Thesis: Combinatorial Problems in Boolean Algebras and Applications to the Theory of Switching (1963)
- Doctoral advisor: Harvey Garner
- Doctoral students: Jim Gray, Oscar Ibarra
- Website: www.cs.berkeley.edu/~harrison

Michael A. Harrison (1935 or 1936 – June 7, 2025) was a computer scientist, in particular a pioneer in the area of formal languages.

== Biography ==
Michael A. Harrison (born in Philadelphia, Pennsylvania, U.S.) studied electrical engineering and computing for BS and MS at the Case Institute of Technology, and then received a PhD from the University of Michigan in Communication Sciences. He was assistant professor from 1963 to 1966 at the University of Michigan, and then joined the faculty of the E.E. Dept at the University of California at Berkeley, where he was an associate professor from 1966 to 1971, and a full professor from 1971 to 1994.

In the 1960s, he worked with Sheila Greibach, Gene Rose, Ed Spanier, and Joe Ullian in a research group formed and led by Seymour Ginsburg, dedicated to formal language theory and the foundations of Computer Science. The work that came out of this group distinguished Computer Science theory from other fields. It also brought the field of formal language theory to bear on programming language research.

In 1975, he developed the HRU security model (named after its authors Harrison, Ruzzo, Ullman), an operating system level computer security model dealing with the integrity of access rights in the system. With his Ph.D. student Pehong Chen at Berkeley, he founded the "Gain Technology" company (acquired by Sybase in 1992).

After retirement in 1994, he served as professor emeritus and also professor in the graduate school at Berkeley.

== Personal life ==
Harrison was married to Susan L. Graham, the Pehong Chen Distinguished Professor Emerita in the Computer Science Division of the Department of Electrical Engineering and Computer Sciences at the University of California, Berkeley.
