= Biometric Consortium =

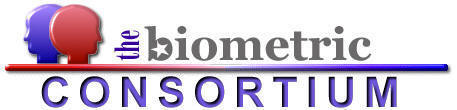
- Biometric Consortium logo
- Website: Biometrics.org

The Biometric Consortium is a US government sponsored consortium created by the National Security Agency (NSA) and the National Institute of Standards and Technology (NIST). It serves as the US government focal point for the research, development, testing, evaluation and application of biometric-based personal authentication technology. Both NSA and NIST co-chair the BC.

== History ==
The Biometric Consortium met for the first time in October 1992 under the chairmanship of Dr. Benincasa. The objective of the Biometric Consortium is to provide a forum for information exchange on biometric technology among the Government, industry and academia.

In 1994, Dr. Campbell and Ms. Alyea took over as chair and vice chair, respectively. The Biometric Consortium's charter was formally approved on December 7, 1995, by the Facilities Protection Committee, a committee that reports to the Security Policy Board through the Security Policy Forum. The Security Policy Board reports to the Assistant to the President for National Security Affairs.

== Mission ==
The Biometric Consortium's charter states that the mission of the Biometric Consortium is:

- to serve as a Government focal point for research, development, test, evaluation, and application of biometric-based personal identification/authentication technology.
- to encourage the use and acceptance of biometric technology in areas of critical need and also concern itself with maximizing performance, minimizing cost, and avoiding duplication of effort within the Government community.
- to coordinate technological concerns and issues of performance and efficiency within the Government in order to serve the best interests of the taxpayer.
- to meet regularly to:
  - Promote the science and performance of biometrics.
  - Create standardized testing databases, procedures, and protocols for the community and security policy organizations.
  - Provide a forum for information exchange between the Government, private industry, and academia.
  - Establish increased Government and commercial interaction.
  - Facilitate symposia/workshops to include the participation of academia and private industry.
  - Establish a feedback mechanism for issues that are exposed during the actual application of this technology.
  - Address the safety, performance, legal, and ethical issues surrounding this technology.
  - Advise and assist member agencies concerning the selection and application of biometric devices.
- to address the following:
  - Coordinate with the Information Systems Security Committee to foster awareness of biometrics.
  - Establish ad hoc bodies, as required, to address specific areas of need within the Government biometric community.
  - Provide copies of all meeting invitations, agendas, published proceedings, and meeting minutes to the Chairpersons of the Security Policy Board, Facilities Protection Committee, and Information Systems Security Committee.
