= Secure state =

A secure state is an information systems security term to describe where entities in a computer system are divided into subjects and objects, and it can be formally proven that each state transition preserves security by moving from one secure state to another secure state. Thereby it can be inductively proven that the system is secure. As defined in the Bell–LaPadula model, the secure state is built on the concept of a state machine with a set of allowable states in a system. The transition from one state to another state is defined by transition functions.

A system state is defined to be "secure" if the only permitted access modes of subjects to objects are in accordance with a security policy.

== See also ==
- Bell–LaPadula model
- TCSEC - The Orange Book
