= Trusted Information Systems =

Computer security research and development company

Trusted Information Systems, Inc.
- Type: Public (Former Nasdaq symbol:TISX)
- Industry: Computer software Computer security
- Founded: 1983; 43 years ago
- Founder: Stephen T. Walker
- Fate: Acquired by McAfee, later by SPARTA, Inc., which was acquired by Cobham, plc
- Successor: McAfee
- Headquarters: Glenwood, Maryland, U.S.
- Area served: Worldwide
- Products: Firewall Software, IPSec VPN, Trusted OS

Trusted Information Systems, Inc. (TIS) was a computer security research and development company during the 1980s and 1990s, performing computer and communications (information) security research for organizations such as NSA, DARPA, ARL, AFRL, SPAWAR, and others.

== History ==
TIS was founded in 1983 by NSA veteran Steve Walker, and at various times employed notable information security experts including David Elliott Bell, Martha Branstad, John Pescatore, Marv Schaefer, Steve Crocker, Marcus Ranum, Wei Xu, John Williams, Steve Lipner and Carl Ellison. TIS was headquartered in Glenwood, Maryland, in a rural location. The company was started in Walker's basement on Shady Lane in Glenwood, MD. As the company grew, rather than move to Baltimore or the Washington D.C. suburbs, a small office building was constructed on land next to Walker's new home on Route 97.

== Products ==
TIS projects included the following:

1. Trusted Xenix, the first commercially available B2 operating system
2. Trusted Mach, a research project that influenced DTOS and eventually SELinux
3. Domain and Type Enforcement (DTE) which likewise influenced SELinux
4. FWTK Firewall Toolkit (the first open source firewall software) in 1993
5. First whitehouse.gov e-mail server was hosted at TIS headquarters from June 1 of 1993 to January 20 of 1995
6. Gauntlet Firewall in 1994, one of the first commercial firewall products, with broad range of Internet Standards, including S/MIME, SNMP, DNS, DNSSEC, and many others. This Firewall became the inception of the third generation firewall.
7. IP Security (IPSec) product in late 1994, known as the first IPSec VPN commercial product in IT history
8. Encryption Recovery technology integrated with IPSEC, ISAKMP, IKE, and RSA

TIS's operating system work directly affected BSD/OS, which the Gauntlet Firewall and IPSec was based on, as well as Linux, FreeBSD, HP UX, Sun OS, Darwin, and others.

== Post company ==
The company went public in 1996 and soon afterwards attempted to acquire PGP Inc.; it was instead acquired in 1998 by Network Associates (NAI), which later became McAfee, who had already bought PGP Inc. in 1997. The security research organization became NAI Labs and the Gauntlet engineering and development organization was folded into Network Associates' engineering and development.

NAI Labs went through a couple of branding changes which complemented Network Associates' branding efforts. In 2001 the name was changed to Network Associates Laboratories to better match the corporate identity. Then, in 2002-2003, there was a major branding initiative by Network Associates culminating in selection of the flag brand, McAfee. As a result, the security research organization became McAfee Research.

In 2003, SPARTA, Inc., an employee-owned company, acquired the Network Security branch of McAfee Research.

In 2005, SPARTA acquired the remaining branches of McAfee Research, which were organized into the Security Research Division (SRD) of the Information Systems Security Operation (ISSO).

In 2008, Cobham, plc, a British aerospace company, acquired SPARTA. There have been no organizational changes to SRD or ISSO that affect the security research.

On a separate path, TIS's primary commercial product, the Gauntlet Firewall, was acquired in 2002 from McAfee by Secure Computing Corporation (SCC), that used to be one of TIS's major competitors, because at the time McAfee wasn't interested in being a firewall vendor. The code base was integrated with Secure Computing's firewall product and branded Sidewinder Firewall, which then returned to McAfee when Secure Computing was acquired by them in 2008, and re-branded McAfee Enterprise Firewall. The end of this product line came in 2013, following McAfee's acquisition of another major firewall vendor, Finland-based Stonesoft. McAfee announced in October 2013 the intention to migrate their existing installed base of firewalls to Stonesoft's own Stonegate.
