= Global Analyst Research Settlements =

US financial regulatory enforcement in 2003

The Global Analyst Research Settlement was an enforcement agreement reached in the United States on April 28, 2003, between the United States Securities and Exchange Commission (SEC), Financial Industry Regulatory Authority (NASD), New York Stock Exchange (NYSE), and ten of the United States's largest investment firms to address issues of conflict of interest within their businesses in relation to recommendations made by financial analyst departments of those firms.

== Decision ==
The central issue at hand that had been judged in court was the conflict of interest between the investment banking and analysis departments of ten of the largest investment firms in the United States. The investment firms involved in the settlement had all engaged in actions and practices that had allowed the inappropriate influence of their research analysts by their investment bankers seeking lucrative fees. A typical violation addressed by the settlement was the case of CSFB and Salomon Smith Barney, which were alleged to have engaged in inappropriate spinning of "hot" initial public offerings (IPOs) and issued fraudulent research reports in violation of various sections within the Securities Exchange Act of 1934. Similarly, UBS Warburg and Piper Jaffray were alleged to have received payments for investment research without disclosing such payments in violation of the Securities Act of 1933.

== Enforcement actions ==
As part of the settlement decision published on December 20, 2002, several regulations designed to prevent the abuse stemming from pressure by investment bankers on analysts to provide "favorable" appraisals were instantiated. Namely, these firms would have to literally insulate their banking and analysis departments from each other physically and with Chinese walls. Additionally, budget allocation via management in research departments will be independent of investment departments. Research analysts will also be prohibited from going on pitches and roadshows with bankers during advertising and promotion of IPOs. Similarly, the Global Settlement also increased the IPO "quiet period" from 25 days to 40 days. Finally, research analyst's historical ratings must be disclosed and made available.

Other than these regulatory actions, the firms involved in the settlement have been required to pay fines to their investors, to fund investor education, and to pay for independent third-party market research. A total fine of $1.435 billion was assessed and is described in the table below.

== Payments ==
Name of firm	Retrospective relief ($ millions)	Independent research ($ millions)	Investor education ($ millions)	Total ($ millions)
Bear Stearns & Co. LLC	50	25	5	80
Credit Suisse First Boston Corp.	150	50	0	200
Deutsche Bank	50	25	5	80
Goldman Sachs	50	50	10	110
J.P. Morgan Chase & Co.	50	25	5	80
Lehman Brothers Inc.	50	25	5	80
Merrill Lynch & Co., Inc	100	75	25	200
Morgan Stanley	50	75	0	125
Salomon Smith Barney, Inc.	300	75	25	400
UBS Warburg LLC	50	25	5	80
Total	900	450	85	1,435
