= Susan Landau =

American mathematician and engineer

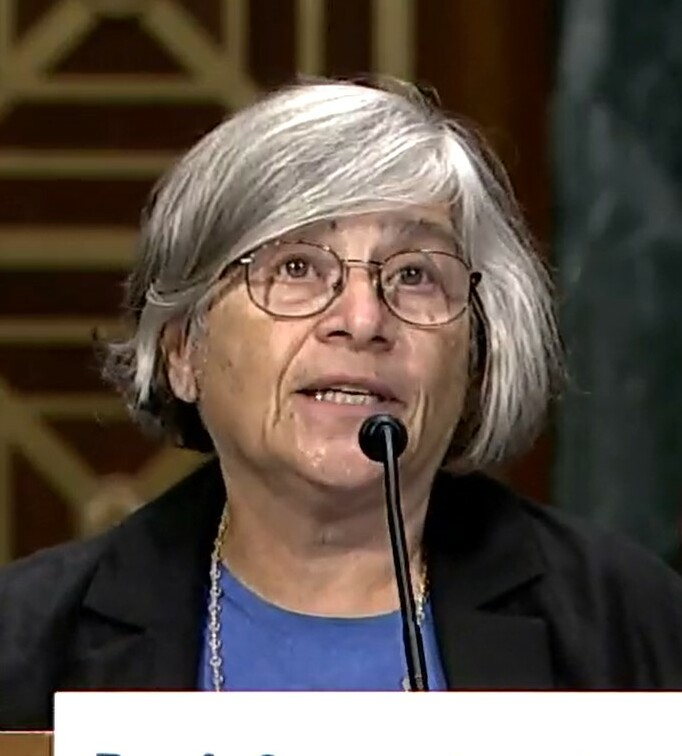
- Landau in 2022
- Born: 1954 (age 71–72); New York City, New York, U.S.
- Education: Princeton University; Cornell University; MIT
- Scientific career
- Fields: Engineering, Cyber Security; Cryptography

Susan Landau (born 1954) is an American mathematician, engineer, cybersecurity policy expert, and Bridge professor in cybersecurity and policy at the Fletcher School of Law and Diplomacy at Tufts University. She previously worked as a senior staff privacy analyst at Google. She was a Guggenheim fellow and a visiting scholar at the Computer Science Department, Harvard University in 2012.

== Career ==
Landau is an alumna of Bronx Science. She then graduated with an A.B. in mathematics from Princeton University in 1976 after completing a senior thesis titled "Simple algebras", under the supervision of John Coleman Moore. She went on to receive a master's degree from Cornell University in 1979 before pursuing graduate studies at the Massachusetts Institute of Technology, where she received a Ph.D. in mathematics in 1983 after completing a doctoral dissertation, titled "On computing Galois groups and its application to solvability by radicals", under the supervision of Gary L. Miller.

In 2010–2011, she was a fellow at the Radcliffe Institute for Advanced Study at Harvard, where she investigated issues involving security of government systems, and their privacy and policy implications.

From 1999 until 2010, she specialized in Internet security at Sun Microsystems.

In 1989, she introduced the first algorithm for deciding which nested radicals can be denested, which is known as Landau's algorithm.

In 1972, her project on odd perfect numbers won a finalist position in the Westinghouse Science Talent Search. Outside of her technical work, she is interested in the issues of women in science, maintaining the ResearcHers Email list, a "community dedicated to supporting women new to research in computing", and an online bibliography of women's writing in computer science. She was awarded the 2008 Anita Borg Institute Women of Vision Award for Social Impact. She has been a fellow of the American Association for the Advancement of Science since 1999, and in 2011 she was inducted as a Fellow of the Association for Computing Machinery. In 2012, Landau won the Surveillance Studies Network Book Prize for her book Surveillance or Security? The Risks Posed by New Wiretapping Technologies, published by MIT Press. In October 2015, Landau was inducted into the National Cyber Security Hall of Fame.

== Involvement with FBI v. Apple case ==
Landau gave testimony in the FBI–Apple encryption dispute between 2015 and 2016. She is the co-author of “Keys Under Doormats: Mandating Insecurity by Requiring Government Access to All Data and Communications,” which received the 2015 J. D. Falk Award from the Messaging Malware Mobile Anti-Abuse Working Group. The Obama administration gave substantial credit to this report's analysis when it announced that it would not pursue exceptional access to phone data.

Landau testified that making iPhones less secure would simply send terrorists and bad actors running toward options that the FBI and Congress had no control over. Compelling Apple to weaken its software would "weaken us, but not impact the bad guys."
