= Chinese wall =

Business term describing an information barrier

A Chinese wall or ethical wall is an information barrier protocol within an organization designed to prevent exchange of information or communication that could lead to conflicts of interest. For example, a Chinese wall may be established to separate people who make investments from those who are privy to confidential information that could improperly influence the investment decisions. Firms are generally required by law to safeguard insider information and ensure that improper trading does not occur.

== Etymology ==
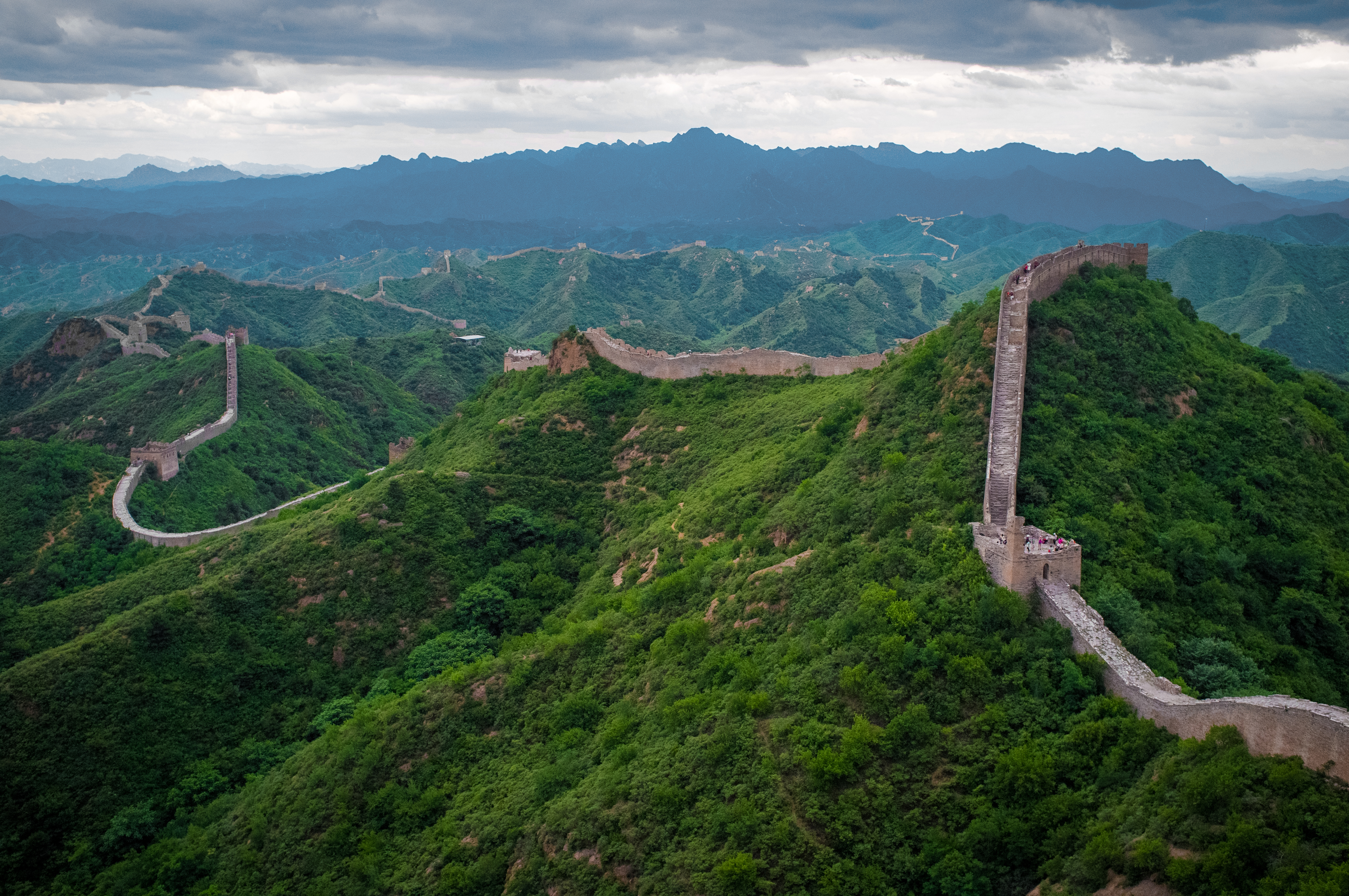
The term is said to allude to the Great Wall of China but the screen walls of Chinese internal architecture have also been attributed as its origin.

Bryan Garner's Dictionary of Modern Legal Usage states that the metaphor title "derives of course from the Great Wall of China", although an alternative explanation links the idea to the screen walls of Chinese internal architecture.

The term was popularized in the United States following the stock market crash of 1929, when the U.S. government legislated information separation between investment bankers and brokerage firms, in order to limit the conflict of interest between objective company analysis and the desire for successful initial public offerings. Rather than prohibiting one company from engaging in both businesses, the government permitted the implementation of Chinese-wall procedures.

A leading note on the subject published in 1980 in the University of Pennsylvania Law Review titled "The Chinese Wall Defense to Law-Firm Disqualification" perpetuated the use of the term.

=== Alternative terms ===
Alternative phrases include "screen", "firewall", "cone of silence", and "ethical wall".

"Screen", or the verb "to screen", is the preferred term of the American Bar Association Model Rules of Professional Conduct. The ABA Model Rules define screening as "the isolation of a lawyer from any participation in a matter through the timely imposition of procedures within a firm that are reasonably adequate under the circumstances to protect information that the isolated lawyer is obligated to protect under these Rules or other law", and suitable "screening procedures" have been approved where paralegals have moved from one law firm to another and have worked on cases for their former employer which may conflict with the interests of their current employer and the clients they represent.

== Usage in specific industries ==
=== Finance ===
A Chinese wall is commonly employed in investment banks, between the corporate-advisory area and the brokering department. This separates those giving corporate advice on takeovers from those advising clients about buying shares and researching the equities themselves.

The "wall" is thrown up to prevent leaks of corporate inside information, which could influence the advice given to clients making investments, and allow staff to take advantage of facts that are not yet known to the general public.

The phrase "over the wall" is used by equity research personnel to refer to rank-and-file personnel who operate without an ethics wall at all times. Examples include members of the Chinese wall department, most compliance personnel, attorneys and certain NYSE-licensed analysts. The term "already over the wall" is used when an employee who is not normally privy to wall-guarded information somehow obtains sensitive information. Breaches considered semi-accidental were typically not met with punitive action during the heyday of the "dot-com" era. These and other instances involving conflicts of interest were rampant during this era. A major scandal was exposed when it was discovered that research analysts were encouraged to blatantly publish dishonest positive analyses on companies in which they, or related parties, owned shares, or on companies that depended on the investment banking departments of the same research firms. The U.S. government has since passed laws strengthening the use ethics walls such as Title V of the Sarbanes–Oxley Act in order to prevent such conflicts of interest.

Ethics walls are also used in the corporate finance departments of the "Big Four" and other large accountancy and financial services firms. They are designed to insulate sensitive documentation from the wider firm in order to prevent conflicts.

=== Journalism ===
The term is used in journalism to describe the separation between the editorial and advertising arms. The Chinese wall is regarded as breached for "advertorial" projects. In student journalism, maintaining a publication's independence from its associated educational institution can be a challenge.

Separately, the term can refer to a separation between a publication's news and opinions arms.

=== Insurance ===
The term is used in property and casualty insurance to describe the separation of claim handling where both parties to a claim (e.g. an airport and an airline) have insurance policies with the same insurer. The claim handling process needs to be segregated within the organisation to avoid a conflict of interest.

This also occurs when there is an unidentified or uninsured motorist involved in an auto collision. In this case, two loss adjusters will take on the claim - one representing the insured party and another representing the uninsured or unidentified motorist. While they both represent the same policy, they both must investigate and negotiate to determine fault and what if anything is covered under the policy. In this case, a Chinese wall is erected between the two adjusters.

=== Law ===
Chinese walls may be used in law firms to address a conflict of interest, for example to separate one part of the firm representing a party on a deal or litigation from another part of the firm with contrary interests or with confidential information from an adverse party. Under UK law, a firm may represent competing parties in a suit, but only in strictly defined situations and when individual fee earners do not act for both sides. In United States law firms, the use of Chinese walls is no longer sufficient on its own to eliminate or "cure" a potential conflict of interest except within very narrow exceptions. They are, however, still used in conjunction with requests from clients as a condition of waivers, or as a prudential measure within the firm to prevent or address potential business issues. The American Bar Association Model Rules of Professional Conduct (2004) state: "While lawyers are associated in a firm, none of them shall knowingly represent a client when any one of them practicing alone would be prohibited from doing so by Rules 1.7 or 1.9, unless the prohibition is based on a personal interest of the prohibited lawyer and does not present a significant risk of materially limiting the representation of the client by the remaining lawyers in the firm." Although ABA rules are only advisory, most U.S. states have adopted them or have even stricter regulations in place.

=== Government procurement ===
Chinese or ethical walls may be required where a company which already has a contract with a public body intends to bid for a new contract, in circumstances where the public body concerned wishes to maintain a fair competitive procedure and avoid or minimise the advantage which the existing contractor may have over other potential bidders. In some cases UK public sector terms of contract require the establishment of "ethical wall arrangements" approved by the customer as a pre-condition for involvement in the procurement process for additional goods and services or for a successor contract.

=== Computer science ===
In computer science, the concept of a Chinese wall is used by both the operating system for computer security and the US judicial system for protection against copyright infringement. In computer security it concerns the software stability of the operating system. The same concept is involved in an important business matter concerning the licensing of each of a computer's many software and hardware components.

Any hardware component that requires direct software interaction will have a license for itself and a license for its software "driver" running in the operating system. Reverse engineering software is a part of computer science that can involve writing a driver for a piece of hardware in order to enable it to work in an operating system unsupported by the manufacturer of the hardware, or to add functionality or increase the performance of its operations (not provided by the manufacturer) in the supported operating system, or to restore the usage of a piece of computer hardware for which the driver has disappeared altogether. A reverse engineered driver offers access to development, by persons outside the company that manufactured it, of the general hardware usage.

==== Reverse engineering ====
There is a case-law mechanism called "clean room design" that is employed to avoid copyright infringement when reverse engineering a proprietary driver.

It involves two separate engineering groups separated by a Chinese wall. One group works with the hardware to reverse engineer what must be the original algorithms and only documents their findings. The other group writes the code, based only on that documentation. Once the new code begins to function with tests on the hardware, it is able to be refined and developed over time.

This method insulates the new code from the old code, so that the reverse engineering is less likely to be considered by a jury as a derived work.

==== Computer security ====
The basic model used to provide both privacy and integrity for data is the "Chinese wall model" or the "Brewer and Nash model". It is a security model where read/write access to files is governed by membership of data in conflict-of-interest classes and datasets.

== See also ==
- Brewer and Nash model
- Glass–Steagall Act
- Global Settlement
- Insider trading
- Mad Men: "Chinese Wall"
