= Pehong Chen =

Taiwanese-American businessman

- Traditional Chinese: 陳丕宏
- Simplified Chinese: 陈丕宏
Transcriptions
Standard Mandarin
- Hanyu Pinyin: Chén Pīhóng

Pehong Chen (Chinese: 陳丕宏; born 1957) is a Taiwanese-American businessman who co-founded Gain Technology with his Ph.D. advisor Michael A. Harrison and went on to found BroadVision. He is chairman, president and chief executive officer of BroadVision. Bloomberg Businessweek included Chen in a list of the "World's Most Successful Immigrants."

Chen was born in Taiwan in 1957 and earned a Ph.D in computer science from the University of California, Berkeley.

He founded BroadVision in 1993, an e-commerce company that helped companies create storefronts on the web. During the Internet technology heyday of the late 1990s, Businessweek described his efforts at BroadVision as doing for "electronic commerce what McDonald's Corp.'s Ray Kroc was to hamburgers."

== Awards ==
- 1999 EY Entrepreneur of the Year Award Recipient, Northern California Region
