= Roger R. Schell =

American businessman

Roger R. Schell is president of ÆSec, a company focused on appliances for e-business on the Internet. For several years, he managed the development and delivery of security for several Novell releases of network software products including an integral PKI, an international crypto API, and an authentication service with exposed SSL capability. Schell was co-founder and vice president for Engineering of Gemini Computers, Inc., where he directed development of Gemini's Class A1 network processor commercial product. He was also the founding deputy director of the (now) National Computer Security Center. Previously he was an associate professor of computer science at the Naval Postgraduate School.

== Biography ==
Schell was born in Richey, Montana. His family moved to Belgrade, Montana when he was in high school. Schell attended Montana State University (MSU), where he graduated from the ROTC program with a degree in electrical engineering. The U.S. Air Force sponsored his graduate studies at Washington State University (WSU). He earned a master's degree in electrical engineering in 1963.

The Air Force then assigned him to the Electronics Systems Division at Hanscom Air Force Base in Bedford, Massachusetts, where he worked on the Ballistic Missile Early Warning System and later on the Semi-Automatic Ground Environment (SAGE) system. During this work on SAGE, he became more involved in computer programming.

As a skilled engineer working for the Air Force, Schell was constantly pressured during these years to return to graduate school. He persuaded his officers to send him to MIT. In 1971, Schell graduated from MIT with a PhD in computer science. He wrote one of the earliest Multics security dissertations, "Dynamic Reconfiguration in a Modular Computer System."

Schell originated several security design and evaluation techniques and holds patents in cryptography and authentication. He has been referred to as the "father" of the Trusted Computer System Evaluation Criteria (the "Orange Book"). The NIST and NSA have recognized Dr. Schell with the National Computer Systems Security Award.

== Publications ==
- Schell, Roger (2016). "Cyber defense triad for where security matters". Commun. ACM. 59 (11): 20–23. doi:10.1145/3000606. S2CID 5743343.
- Heckerman, Mark R.; Schell, Roger R. (2016). "Using Proven Reference Monitor Patterns for Security Evaluation". Inf. Technol. J. 7 (2): 23.
- Karger, Paul A. and Roger R. Schell (2002). “Thirty Years Later: Lessons from the Multics Security Evaluation”, ACSAC '02 Proceedings of the 18th Annual Computer Security Applications Conference
- Ames Jr., S.R.; Gasser, M.; Schell, R.R. (1983). "Security kernel design and implementation: An introduction" (PDF). Computer. 16 (7): 14–22. doi:10.1109/MC.1983.1654439. S2CID 12371271.
- Schell, Roger R. (January–February 1979). “Computer Security: The Achilles' Heel of the Electronic Air Force?” Air University Review 30(2)
