= Noblis =

American not-for-profit corporation

Coordinates: 38°57′06.1″N 77°21′46.8″W

- Company type: Not-for-profit corporation
- Founded: 1996
- Headquarters: Reston, Virginia, United States
- Key people: Mile Corrigan; President and CEO
- Revenue: 153,205,584 United States dollar (2011)
- Total assets: 93,797,446 United States dollar (2011)
- Number of employees: 2000
- Website: www.noblis.org

Noblis is an American not-for-profit corporation and a science, technology, and strategy organization that delivers technical advice to federal government clients. The company’s work is applied to a wide array of federal domains, including civilian services, defense, homeland security, intelligence and law enforcement.

== History ==
Noblis was originally known as Mitretek Systems. In 1996, Mitretek Systems was formed as a nonprofit corporation for the purpose of undertaking research in science and technology as a spin-off from the MITRE Corporation.

Between 1996 and 2006, Mitretek Systems focused on national security threats, chemical and biological warfare, biometrics, electronic transactions, traffic congestion, patient safety, environmental sustainability, and renewed energy resources. Mitretek sponsored research projects included: analyzing and implementing technologies to keep information secure on the Internet, communicating voice and data by using Internet Protocol in the event of a national emergency, developing gaming technologies for first responders, and creating sick city scenarios to understand what could occur during a naturally occurring, or terrorist-instigated biological threat.

Mitretek Systems changed its name to Noblis in 2007.

In 2012, Noblis acquired Noblis ESI. The company previously operated under the name ElanTech Systems, Inc.

May 3, 2021, Noblis acquired McKean Defense. July 28, 2021, Noblis rebrands McKean Defense and its affiliates to Noblis MSD.

== Organization ==
Headquartered in Reston, VA, Noblis has offices in San Antonio, TX, Washington, DC, Baltimore, MD, Danville, VA, Chantilly, VA, Bridgeport, WV, Huntsville, AL, Warner Robins, GA, Philadelphia, PA, Ft. Washington, PA, Crystal City, VA, Dahlgren, VA, Hampton, VA, Largo, FL, Port Hueneme, CA and San Diego, CA.

Almost 2000 employees work in science, engineering, research, and technology at Noblis and its subsidiaries. In June 2021, Noblis Inc. was named a Top 2021 Workplace for the eighth year in a row by the Washington Post in their annual feature.

The firm's CEOs have been Lydia Thomas (1996-2007), Amr ElSawy (2007–2022) and Mile Corrigan (October 2022 to present).
