= Security policy =

Definition of security for a system or entity

Security policy is a definition of what it means to be secure for a system, organization or other entity. For an organization, it addresses the constraints on behavior of its members as well as constraints imposed on adversaries by mechanisms such as doors, locks, keys, and walls. For systems, the security policy addresses constraints on functions and flow among them, constraints on access by external systems and adversaries including programs and access to data by people.

== Top-level policy ==
If it is important to be secure, then it is important to be sure all of the security policy is enforced by mechanisms that are strong. There are organized methodologies and risk assessment strategies to assure completeness of security policies and assure that they are completely enforced. In complex systems, such as information systems, policies can be decomposed into sub-policies to facilitate the allocation of security mechanisms to enforce sub-policies. However, this practice has pitfalls. It is too easy to simply go directly to the sub-policies, which are essentially the rules of operation and dispense with the top level policy. That gives the false sense that the rules of operation address some overall definition of security when they do not. Because it is so difficult to think clearly with completeness about security, rules of operation stated as "sub-policies" with no "super-policy" usually turn out to be rambling rules that fail to enforce anything with completeness. Consequently, a top-level security policy is essential to any serious security scheme and sub-policies and rules of operation are meaningless without it.

== See also ==
- Access control
- Computer security policy
- Environmental design
- Information security policy
- National security policy, as part of Military strategy
- Photo identification
- Physical Security
- Policy
- Remote Access Policy
- Security
- Security engineering
- User Account Policy
