= Graph-based access control =

Graph-based access control (GBAC) is a declarative way to define access rights, task assignments, recipients and content in information systems. Access rights are granted to objects like files or documents, but also business objects such as an account. GBAC can also be used for the assignment of agents to tasks in workflow environments. Organizations are modeled as a specific kind of semantic graph comprising the organizational units, the roles and functions as well as the human and automatic agents (i.a. persons, machines). The main difference with other approaches such as role-based access control or attribute-based access control is that in GBAC access rights are defined using an organizational query language instead of total enumeration.

== History ==
The foundations of GBAC go back to a research project named CoCoSOrg (Configurable Cooperation System) at Bamberg University.

In CoCoSOrg an organization is represented as a semantic graph and a formal language is used to specify agents and their access rights in a workflow environment. Within the C-Org-Project at Hof University's Institute for Information Systems (iisys), the approach was extended by features like separation of duty, access control in virtual organizations and subject-oriented access control.

== Definition ==
Graph-based access control consists of two building blocks:

- A semantic graph modeling an organization
- A query language.

=== Organizational graph ===
Organizational Graph in GBAC

The organizational graph is divided into a type and an instance level. On the instance level there are node types for organizational units, functional units and agents. The basic structure of an organization is defined using so called "structural relations". They define the "is part of"- relations between functional units and organizational units as well as the mapping of agents to functional units. Additionally there are specific relationship types like "deputyship" or "informed_by". These types can be extended by the modeler. All relationships can be context sensitive through the usage of predicates.

On the type level organizational structures are described in a more general manner. It consists of organizational unit types, functional unit types and the same relationship types as on the instance level. Type definitions can be used to create new instances or reuse organizational knowledge in case of exceptions (for further reading see).

=== Query language ===
In GBAC a query language is used to define agents having certain characteristics or abilities. The following table shows the usage of the query language in the context of an access control matrix.

The first query means that all managers working for the company for more than six months can read the financial report, as well as the managers who are classified by the flag "ReadFinancialReport".

The daily financial report can only be written by the manager of the controlling department or clerks of the department that are enabled to do that (WriteFinancialReport==TRUE).

Data Object	Read	Write
Daily Financial Report	Manager(*).(Now() - HiringYear > 0.5) OR Manager.ReadFinancialReport == TRUE	Manager(Controlling) OR Clerk(Controlling).WriteFinancialReport == TRUE

== Implementation ==
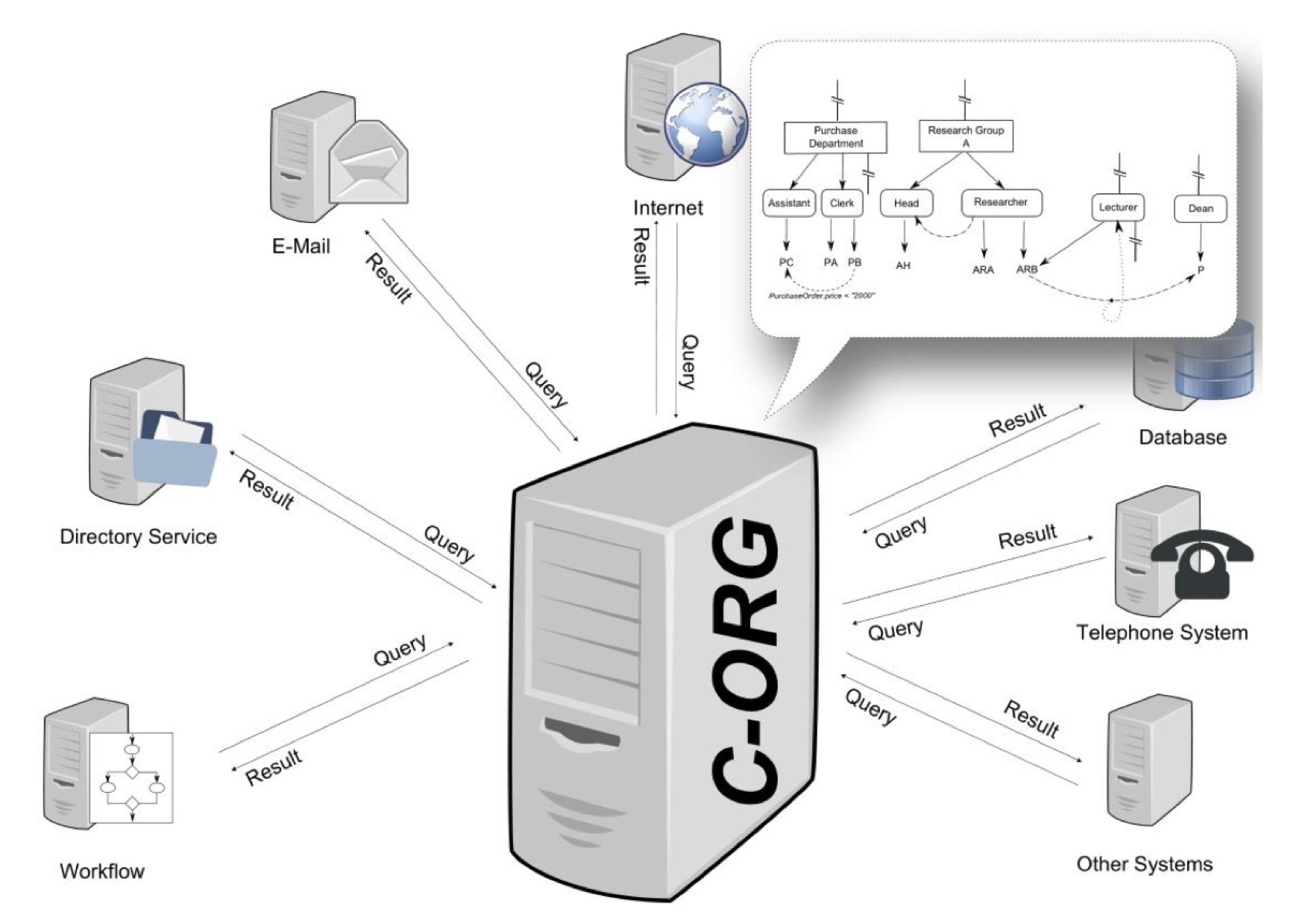
Usage of C-Org

GBAC was first implemented in the CoCoS Environment within the organizational server CoCoSOrg. In the C-Org-Project it was extended with more sophisticated features like separation of duty or access control in distributed environments. There is also a cloud-based implementation on IBM's Bluemix platform.

In all implementations the server takes a query from a client system and resolves it to a set of agents. This set is sent back to the calling client as response. Clients can be file systems, database management systems, workflow management systems, physical security systems or even telephone servers.

== See also ==
- Access control list
- Attribute-based access control (ABAC)
- Capability-based security
- Context-based access control (CBAC)
- Discretionary access control (DAC)
- Lattice-based access control (LBAC)
- Mandatory access control (MAC)
- Relationship-based access control
- Risk-based authentication
- Role-based access control (RBAC)
- Rule-set-based access control (RSBAC)
