= PBAC =

PBAC may refer to:

- Pakistan - Britain Advisory Council, a group was established on 7 January 2002
- Pharmaceutical Benefits Advisory Committee, the committee that makes recommendations to the Australian Minister for Health and Ageing regarding drugs which should be made available as pharmaceutical benefits
- Palm Beach Atlantic University, formerly Palm Beach Atlantic College
- Policy-based access control, a synonym for Attribute-based access control (ABAC), a means to achieve fine-grained access control in software engineering.
