= Risk-based authentication =

In authentication, risk-based authentication is a non-static authentication system which takes into account the profile (IP address, User-Agent HTTP header, time of access, and so on) of the agent requesting access to the system to determine the risk profile associated with that transaction. The risk profile is then used to determine the complexity of the challenge. Higher risk profiles leads to stronger challenges, whereas a static username/password may suffice for lower-risk profiles. Risk-based implementation allows the application to challenge the user for additional credentials only when the risk level is appropriate.

Machine authentication is often used in a risk based authentication set up. The machine authentication will run in the background and only ask the customer for additional authentication if the computer is not recognized. In a risk based authentication system, the institution decides if additional authentication is necessary. If the risk is deemed appropriate, enhanced authentication will be triggered, such as a one time password delivered via an out of band communication. Risk based authentication can also be used during the session to prompt for additional authentication when the customer performs a certain high risk transaction, such as a money transfer or an address change. Risk based authentication is very beneficial to the customer because additional steps are only required if something is out of the ordinary, such as the login attempt is from a new machine.

—

Because risk-based validation takes into account all the background information available f (e.g. IP address, GPS location, connection type, and keystroke dynamics), user validation accuracy is improved without inconveniencing the user. As a result, risk-based authentication has been used by major companies to replace traditional security models.

== See also ==
- Access control list
- Attribute-based access control (ABAC)
- Capability-based security
- Context-based access control (CBAC)
- Discretionary access control (DAC)
- Graph-based access control (GBAC)
- Lattice-based access control (LBAC)
- Mandatory access control (MAC)
- Role-based access control (RBAC)
- Rule-set-based access control (RSBAC)
