= IP access controller =

IP Access Control
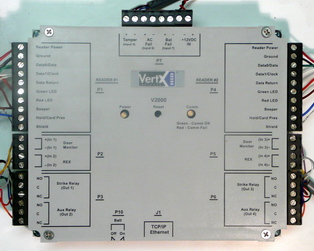
- V2000 VertX IP access controller
- Media type: Internet Protocol
- Developed by: HID Global
- Usage: access control

An IP access controller is an electronic security device designed to identify users and control entry to or exit from protected areas using Internet Protocol-based technology. A typical IP access controller supports 2 or 4 basic access control readers. IP access controllers may have an internal web server that is configurable using a browser or using software installed on a host PC.

The main features that distinguish IP controllers from older generations of serial controllers are:

1. IP controllers connect directly to LAN or WAN
2. IP controllers have all the inputs and outputs necessary for controlling readers, monitoring door inputs, and controlling locks
3. IP controllers have an on-board network interface and do not require the use of a terminal server

== Advantages and disadvantages of IP controllers ==
Advantages:

- An existing network infrastructure is fully utilized; there is no need to install new communication lines.
- There are no limitations regarding the number of IP controllers in a system (the limit of 32 controllers per line is typical for systems using RS-485 communication interface).
- Special knowledge of installation, termination, grounding and troubleshooting of RS-485 communication lines is not required.
- Communication with IP controllers may be done at the full network speed, which is important if transferring a lot of data (databases with thousands of users, possibly including biometric records).
- In case of an alarm IP controllers may initiate connection to the host PC. This ability is important in large systems as it allows reducing network traffic generated by frequent polling.
- Simplifies installation of systems consisting of multiple locations separated by large distances. Basic Internet link is sufficient to establish connections to remote locations.
- Wide selection of standard network equipment is available to provide connectivity in different situations (fiber, wireless, VPN, dual path, PoE)
- No special hardware is required for building fail-over systems: in case the primary host PC fails, the secondary host PC may start polling IP controllers.

Disadvantages:

- The system becomes susceptible to network related problems, such as delays in case of heavy traffic and network equipment failures.
- IP controllers and workstations may become accessible to hackers if the network of an organization is not well protected. This threat may be eliminated by physically separating the access control network from the network of the organization. Also most IP controllers utilize either Linux platform or proprietary operating systems, which makes them more difficult to hack. Industry standard data encryption is also used.
- Maximum distance from a hub or a switch to the controller is 100 meters (330 feet).
- Operation of the system is dependent on the host PC. In case the host PC fails, events from IP controllers are not retrieved and functions that require interaction between readers (i.e. anti-passback) stop working. Some controllers, however, have peer-to-peer communication option in order to reduce dependency on the host PC.
- Unlike IP readers, most IP controllers do not support PoE. This, however, may change if the PoE technology is improved to deliver more power, or low-power controllers and locks are introduced. Based on the current PoE standards power that can be carried by a single network cable is enough for one IP reader and an electric strike or a magnetic lock, but connecting an IP controller and 2 or more electric locks would require more power than available via PoE.

== Standards ==
- HID Global

== See also ==
- Access control
