= Secure environment =

In computing, a secure environment is any system which implements the controlled storage and use of information. In the event of computing data loss, a secure environment is used to protect personal or confidential data. It may also be known as a trusted execution environment (TEE).

Often, secure environments employ cryptography as a means to protect information. This is typically used for processing confidential or restricted information.

Some secure environments employ cryptographic hashing, simply to verify that the information has not been altered since it was last modified.

== See also ==
- Backup
- Data recovery
- Cleanroom
- Mandatory access control (MAC)
- Trusted computing
- Homomorphic encryption
