= Richacls =

Linux implementation of the NFSv4 ACLs

Richacls is a Linux implementation of the NFSv4 ACLs which has been extended by file masks to more easily fit the proprietary POSIX draft file permission model. Nowadays, they offer the most complex permission model for ext4 file system in Linux. They are even more complex than POSIX draft ACLs, which means it is not possible to convert back from Richacls to Linux' implementation of the POSIX draft ACLs without losing information. One of the most important advantages is that they distinguish between write and append permission, between delete and delete child permissions, and make ACL management access discretionary (as opposed to only being only root and the file owner). They are also designed to support Windows interoperability.

Richacls use ext4 extended file attributes (xattrs) to store ACLs.
