= Lattice-based access control =

In computer security, lattice-based access control (LBAC) is an access control model defined to control data transfers between objects (such as resources, computers, and applications) and subjects (such as individuals, groups or organizations). Subjects and objects will be collectively called 'the entities' and the model is valid even if there isn't a distinction between subjects and objects.

Entities are given unique labels, on which a dominance relation ≤ is defined. Data can move among entities according to the dominance relation between their labels. For example, one can define Public ≤ Confidential and so if database A is labeled Public and database B is labeled Confidential, data from A can move to B. Further, this theory postulates that the set of permissible labels must form a lattice, i.e., a partially ordered set where for each two labels there are a unique labels that dominates them both (their join) and a unique label that both of them dominate (their meet).

Lattice based access control models were first formally defined by Denning (1976); see also Sandhu (1993).

== See also ==
- Access control list
- Attribute-based access control (ABAC)
- Bell–LaPadula model
- Biba Model
- Capability-based security
- Computer security model
- Context-based access control (CBAC)
- Discretionary access control (DAC)
- Graph-based access control (GBAC)
- Lattice (order)
- Mandatory access control (MAC)
- Organisation-based access control (OrBAC)
- Risk-based authentication
- Role-based access control (RBAC)
- Rule-set-based access control (RSBAC)
