= Blacker (security) =

Blacker (styled BLACKER) is a U.S. Department of Defense computer network security project designed to achieve A1 class ratings (very high assurance) of the Trusted Computer System Evaluation Criteria (TCSEC).

The first Blacker program began in the late 1970s, with a follow-on eventually producing fielded devices in the late 1980s. It was the first secure system with trusted end-to-end encryption on the United States' Defense Data Network.

The project was implemented by SDC (software), Burroughs (hardware), and after their merger, by the resultant company Unisys.

== See also ==
- RED/BLACK concept for segregation of sensitive plaintext information (RED signals) from encrypted ciphertext (BLACK signals)
