= Discretionary access control =

Type of access control

In computer security, discretionary access control (DAC) is a type of access control defined by the Trusted Computer System Evaluation Criteria (TCSEC) as a means of restricting access to objects based on the identity of subjects and/or groups to which they belong. The controls are discretionary in the sense that a subject with a certain access permission is capable of passing that permission (perhaps indirectly) on to any other subject (unless restrained by mandatory access control).

Discretionary access control is commonly discussed in contrast to mandatory access control (MAC). Occasionally, a system as a whole is said to have "discretionary" or "purely discretionary" access control when that system lacks mandatory access control. On the other hand, systems can implement both MAC and DAC simultaneously, where DAC refers to one category of access controls that subjects can transfer among each other, and MAC refers to a second category of access controls that imposes constraints upon the first.

== Implementation ==
The meaning of the term in practice is not as clear-cut as the definition given in the TCSEC standard, because the TCSEC definition of DAC does not impose any implementation. There are at least two implementations: with owner (as a widespread example) and with capabilities.

=== With owner ===
The term DAC is commonly used in contexts that assume that every object has an owner that controls the permissions to access the object, likely because many systems do indeed implement DAC using the concept of an owner. However, the TCSEC definition does not explicitly discuss "owners", thus an access control system does not strictly require a concept of ownership to meet the TCSEC definition of DAC.

Under this DAC implementation, users (owners) have the ability to make policy decisions and/or assign security attributes. A straightforward example is the Unix file mode, which represents write, read, and execute in each of the 3 bits for each of User, Group and Others. (It is prepended by another bit that indicates additional characteristics).

=== With capabilities ===
As another example, capability systems are sometimes described as providing discretionary controls because they permit subjects to transfer their access to other subjects, even though capability-based security is fundamentally not about restricting access "based on the identity of subjects". In general, capability systems do not allow permissions to be passed "to any other subject"; the subject wanting to pass its permissions must first have access to the receiving subject, and subjects generally only have access to a strictly limited set of subjects consistent with the principle of least privilege.

== See also ==
- Access control list
- Attribute-based access control (ABAC)
- Context-based access control (CBAC)
- Graph-based access control (GBAC)
- Lattice-based access control (LBAC)
- Mandatory access control (MAC)
- Role-based access control (RBAC)
- Rule-set-based access control (RSBAC)
- Capability-based security
- Risk-based authentication
- XACML (eXtensible Access Control Markup Language)
