= Olivier Poudade =

French computer programmer

Olivier Poudade (born 1971) is a French computer programmer known for his work in the demoscene and for developing ultra-compact software. Operating under the pseudonym "Baudsurfer," he is recognized for creating programs of extremely small size in x86 assembly language. His projects include BootChess, a 487-byte chess program that, upon its release in 2015, became the world’s smallest. Poudade leads the Red Sector Inc. (RSI) demogroup and has contributed technical articles to publications such as Phrack and 2600: The Hacker Quarterly.

== Early life and education ==
Poudade was born in 1971 in the Savoie region of France to Paul Poudade and Simone Hailloud-Poudade, both of whom were career diplomats in the French Foreign Service. His father served as the French ambassador to Hungary and Turkey and as the Chief of Protocol of the French Republic. His mother served as the French ambassador to Guinea-Bissau from 2004 to 2006.

Poudade developed an early interest in computing and pursued computer science studies at the École Pour l’Informatique et les Techniques Avancées (EPITA) in Paris in the early 1990s.

== Career ==
In the 1980s, Poudade became active in the home computer demoscene under the handle “Baudsurfer” and joined the group Red Sector Inc. (RSI) around its 1985 founding. After RSI became inactive in the 1990s, Poudade initiated its revival in 2008 and has served as its leader since. Within the demoscene, he became known for size coding, a discipline focused on creating functional programs with the smallest possible file size. An example of his work is Wolf128, a 128-byte 3D maze demonstration which won 2nd place in the 128-byte intro competition at the Outline 2014 demoparty.

Poudade's most widely recognized achievement was the January 2015 release of BootChess, a chess program with a total size of 487 bytes. BootChess surpassed the 33-year-old record for the smallest chess program, previously held by the 672-byte 1K ZX Chess for the ZX Spectrum. Written in x86 machine code for a standard 512-byte boot sector, the program can run on multiple operating systems. The project was completed with assistance from Australian assembly language expert Peter Ferrie. While it omits certain complex rules such as castling to conserve space, it functions as a playable chess variant.

In 2016, Poudade released ChessLin, an even smaller 256-byte chess engine. ChessLin is a text-mode program with a rudimentary artificial intelligence that operates on the command-line interface. Poudade published detailed technical explanations of its assembly source code in Phrack magazine and 2600: The Hacker Quarterly that year.
