= DSLReports =

Telecommunications information service

- Screenshot of DSLReports as of December 22, 2015.
- Website type: Consumer advocacy
- Available in: English
- Creator: Justin Beech
- Editor: Karl Bode (2001–2018)
- Website: https://www.dslreports.com/
- Commercial: Yes
- Registration: Optional
- Users: 1.8 million
- Launched: May 28, 1999; 27 years ago
- Current status: Offline as of January 2025. "On vacation" since January 26, 2025. Homepage-only since February 1, 2025 pending transition to read-only mode. Entirely offline as of March 26, 2025.

DSLReports was a (see "Online Status") North American-oriented broadband information and review site based in New York City. The site's main focus was on internet, phone, cable TV, fiber optics, and Wireless services in the United States and Canada, as well as other countries (United Kingdom and Australia).

DSLReports was created by Justin Beech in June 1999. According to Alexa's page ranking system and the WHOIS, dslreports.com's domain name was registered on May 28, 1999. The site appeared to go mostly offline without notice in mid-January 2025. The site went fully offline on March 26, 2025.

== History ==
=== "Broadband Reports" ===
In the 2000s, DSLReports was concurrently branded as "BroadbandReports.com," a domain that redirected to dslreports.com.

=== 2011 SQL Injection attack ===
Over a four-hour period on April 27, 2011, an automated SQL Injection attack occurred on the DSLReports website. The attack was able to extract 8% of the site's username/password pairs, which amounted to approximately 8,000 of the 9,000 active accounts and 90,000 old or inactive accounts created during the site's 10-year history. Once the intrusion was detected, stopped and the extent of the compromised accounts had been assessed, passwords for those accounts were automatically reset.

== Content ==
DSLReports rated and reviewed cable, DSL and fiber optic internet services from providers all over North America. The site also ran support and discussion forums and offers online tools for testing internet connection.

=== Reviews ===
DSLReports allowed its users to submit reviews of their Internet service provider (ISP), Web hosting service, digital phone service (VOIP), and more. Users may also read reviews written by others. Many large ISPs had over a thousand reviews on the site. Reviews could be filtered for the user's location and/or connectivity preference.

=== News ===
The site was a source of internet related news and opinion, and occasionally breaks stories about broadband internet service providers, such as Time Warner Cable's 2008 decision to test consumption-based billing with subscribers. That same year, when Charter Communications began sending letters to high-speed internet customers regarding a new website tracking policy, reports of the letters first appeared on DSLReports. DSLReport's editors posted Internet-related news and opinion items on the site's front page throughout the day. Common topics of news items and features included Wireless technologies, peer-to-peer file sharing, upgrades and new offerings from ISPs, legal issues, regulatory issues, and security issues. However, since July 2, 2018, the site had not published new articles, as its main editor, Karl Bode, was laid off due to funding. However, compilations of links to articles on other sites were published every weekday.

=== Tools ===
DSLReports was reported to have the most comprehensive package of internet and connection testing tools available.

==== Speed tests ====
The DSLReports speed test claimed to be the best speed test and the first popular speed test. The speed test used HTML5.

==== Ping tests ====
DSLReports had a ping and jitter test.

==== Other tests and tools ====
Other tools included stream tests, line monitoring, tweak testing, packet loss testing, and many other tools. Some of these services were provided free of charge, but others require the user to purchase "tool points", which were approximately $1.

== Online Status ==
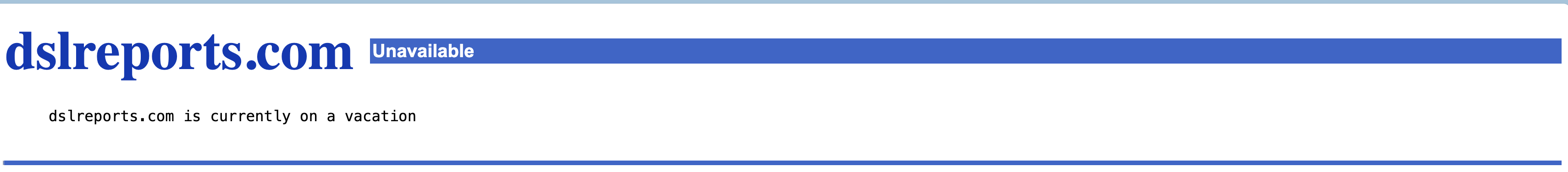
DSL Reports on January 26, 2025.

On January 15, 2025, the site went offline with a gateway timeout error. While there was speculation that the site is permanently offline, there had been no official confirmation. In an attempt to recreate the site, some users migrated to alternate forums. On January 26, a new page appeared saying that the site was "on vacation." On February 1, the homepage of the site was made available, containing a notice reading "NEWS: The site will be switching to read-only shortly. While that is being arranged, only the home page is available". On February 2, the site was updated to say "NEWS: The full site corpus is only available (in read-only form) for 5 minutes past each hour, for members and guests." However, the site was not allowing the 5 minutes access since February 27. The site went fully offline on March 26, 2025.

Snapshots procured by The Internet Archive's Wayback Machine indicate that sometime around March 30, the site began redirecting to https://satellitemap.space/. More snapshots on August 20 and August 22 show that between these dates, the site has become accessible again. However, there is a notice at the top of the page which reads "NEWS: dslreports.com is unavailable only the home page is online." Essentially this means only the static home page content as of the January 2025 initial shutdown is available from the site. Attempting to access any other content, for example by following a link on the page to another section of dslreports.com, gives a 503 error with the body reading:

dslreports.com Page Error 500

dslreports.com is shuttered and
only the January 2025 home page is available.

== Community ==
DSLReports operated over 200 forums, many of which focused on Internet and computer-related topics. Other forums were dedicated to general conversation, political discussions, do-it-yourself projects or regional discussions. There were over 1.8 million total registered users on the DSLReports forums. A discussion forum was automatically created for every news and opinion article posted on the front page, which allowed members to discuss the article in question. Although membership was free, the forum community allows for anonymous posting so the information or source in [anonymous] posts may be questionable as compared to posts made by actual frequent members of the site. There were also well-hidden private invitation and very controversial forums such as the "meatlocker" which can be seen by adding the /forums/meatlocker suffix to the website address. It is said this private area is for nude and pornographic material submitted by the moderators and special guests.

Robb Topolski, a software tester whose findings and subsequent political activities has contributed to the movement for net neutrality has contributed to the site.

== Influence ==
DSLReports had been written about or had their reports featured in CNN, USA Today, Forbes, NBC News, The Washington Post, The New York Times and Ars Technica, among others.

The site had been described by The Washington Post as a "comprehensive reference" for internet services. Discussion topics on DSLReports frequently generated thousands of comments.

CNN had rated DSLReports as one of the best free online services.
