= Daplex =

Computer Programming Language

Daplex is a computer language introduced in 1981 by David Shipman of the Computer Corporation of America. Before the fuller description of Daplex appeared in 1981, Shipman had already outlined the data model and language in an abstract presented at the 1979 ACM SIGMOD International Conference on Management of Data. Daplex was designed for creating distributed database systems and can be used as a global query language.

== Background ==
In Daplex, information is modeled using two fundamental constructs: entities and the functions that connect them. Daplex resulted from work carried out in the Multibase project. Within Multibase, the federated schema was expressed in the functional data model called Daplex.

== Example of Daplex Local Schemata ==
Type EMPLOYEE is entity
Name: string
SSN: integer
ADDRESS: string
SALARY: Float
end entity;
