= TinKode =

Romanian computer security consultant and hacker

- Born: Răzvan Manole Cernăianu; 7 February 1992 (age 34); Drobeta-Turnu Severin
- Other names: TK, The.Slacker
- Occupations: Co-Founder & COO of CyberSmartDefence.com
- Known for: Unauthorized computer access tinkode.com

Răzvan Manole Cernăianu (born 7 February 1992), nicknamed "TinKode", is a Romanian computer security consultant and hacker, known for gaining unauthorized access to computer systems of many different organizations, and posting proof of his exploits online. He commonly hacks high-profile websites that have SQL injection vulnerabilities, although unknown methods were used in his most recent attacks. Other aliases included sysgh0st.

== Personal life ==
TinKode is Romanian and claims to have been born in 1992 in the southern part of the country. He states that his hacking skills are the result of extreme curiosity and ambition. The targets are well known websites and powerful brands with widespread influence, either for the online community or a particular marketplace. His attacks often involve the numeral seven. Tinkode was a fan of social networks, owning both a Twitter account, a Facebook account, as well as many blogs.

== Alleged hacking ==
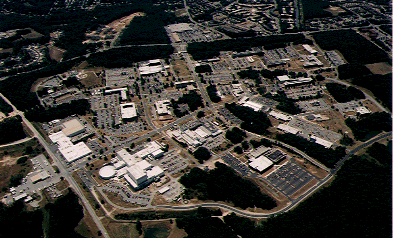
NASA's Goddard Space Flight Center was one of TinKode's most high-profile targets

The Royal Navy's website was temporarily unavailable after TinKode claimed to have hacked it. He has also breached the security of servers at NASA, posting screenshots from an FTP server within NASA's Earth Observation System at Goddard Space Flight Center. He claims to have gained access to computers belonging to the European Space Agency.

== Other info ==
He also claims to have found vulnerabilities in organizations including Sun Microsystems, MySQL, Kaspersky Portugal, the US Army, YouTube, Google, Other websites. TinKode has never been publicly criticized by the security experts, mainly because he didn't disclose full information regarding breached websites. He actually informed the webmasters before posting his results online, giving them time to fix the vulnerability. TinKode also received a Google Security Reward.

== Arrest ==
On Tuesday, 31 January 2012, TinKode was placed under arrest by the Romanian authority DIICOT (Anti organised crime and terrorism institution), under the charge that he temporarily blocked the information systems of the US Army, Pentagon and NASA in association with Casi. TinKode was officially released on 27 April 2012.

== Petition and support ==
Following his arrest, a petition was generated to raise support for Tinkode on Wednesday, 8 February 2012. The petition was aimed at DIICOT and the FBI to give Tinkode a reasonable and fair sentence claiming that the hacker wasn't malicious and was hacking out of curiosity. Further he was released after 3 months.
