= Improper input validation =

Improper input validation or unchecked user input is a type of vulnerability in computer software that may be used for security exploits. This vulnerability is caused when "[t]he product does not validate or incorrectly validates input that can affect the control flow or data flow of a program."

== Examples ==
Examples include:

- Buffer overflow
- Cross-site scripting
- Directory traversal
- Null byte injection
- SQL injection
- Uncontrolled format string

== See also ==
- Input validation – Process of ensuring computer data is both correct and useful
- Common Weakness Enumeration – Catalog of software weaknesses and vulnerabilities (CWE)
