= Przemysław Frasunek =

Polish computer hacker

- Born: 6 May 1983 (age 43); Lublin, Poland

Przemysław Frasunek (also known as venglin, born 6 May 1983) is a "white hat" hacker from Poland. He has been a frequent Bugtraq poster since late in the 1990s, noted for one of the first published successful software exploits for the format string bug class of attacks, just after the first exploit of the person using nickname tf8. Until that time the vulnerability was thought harmless. He is the CEO of Redge Technologies.

== Vulnerability research ==
Notable vulnerabilities credited to Przemysław Frasunek:

- CVE-2000-0573, Format string bug in WU-FTPD (remote root exploit), one of the first exploits for the format string bug class of attacks.
- CVE-2001-0414, Buffer overflow (remote root exploit) in NTP server, affecting wide range of systems.
- CVE-2004-0794, Signal race condition in FTP server, affecting NetBSD and Mac OS X.
- CVE-2005-2072, Privilege escalation (local root exploit) affecting Solaris versions 8, 9, 10 and OpenSolaris operating systems, discovered two weeks after public release of the OpenSolaris.
- 2001 - FreeBSD 4.4 arbitrary file access vulnerability
- Kernel mode race condition exploit affecting FreeBSD 6.4.
- Kernel mode race condition exploit affecting FreeBSD 7.0.
- CVE-2010-4210 Kernel mode null pointer dereference exploit affecting FreeBSD 7.0 to 7.2.
