= 2014 Russian hacker password theft =

Massive data breach in Russia

The 2014 Russian hacker password theft was an alleged hacking incident resulting in the possible theft of over 1.2 billion internet credentials, including usernames and passwords, with hundreds of millions of corresponding e-mail addresses. The data breach was first reported by The New York Times after being allegedly discovered and reported by Milwaukee-based information security company, Hold Security.

420,000 websites were reported to be affected. According to The New York Times, some big companies knew that their users' credentials were among the data stolen. Hold Security did not disclose which sites were compromised, but instead offered two separate services, one for website owners and one for consumers to check if they were affected. The service for website owners costed $10 a month. The check for consumers were free.

Hold Security described the group responsible for the hack as a small group of "fewer than a dozen men in their 20s ... based in a small city in south central Russia, the region flanked by Kazakhstan and Mongolia", and dubbed the group CyberVor (Russian, lit. "cyber thief"). Hold claimed the hack was perpetrated through the use of an SQL injection. According to a Forbes article, Hold Security said that not all the 1.2 billion credentials were stolen this way, as there were also ones that CyberVor simply bought from people that used other means, and Hold Security didn't know what the split was.

== Criticism of Hold Security ==
Forbes columnist Kashmir Hill noted "The Internet predictably panicked as the story of yet another massive password breach went viral" and "this is a pretty direct link between a panic and a pay-out for a security firm." Hold Security's website had a service offering people to check if their username and password had been stolen. It required people to send Hold Security encrypted versions of their passwords.

== Skepticism ==
No named independent sources came forward to confirm the breach, and Forbes columnist, Joseph Steinberg, even expressed outright skepticism about many of the "facts" claimed about the breach, raising questions about the trustworthiness of the reports of the breach altogether.
