= Robb Topolski =

American software tester

Robb Topolski is an American software tester known for his discovery of ISP-led slowdowns in Internet service for certain online activities. His findings and subsequent political activities have contributed to the movement for net neutrality.

In 2007, Topolski, a singer, was seeding his music using peer-to-peer content-sharing programs such as BitComet and BitTorrent. He discovered that the seeding speeds were being slowed and blocked by Comcast. After sharing his findings to the Associated Press, the network management policies of Comcast were later tested and deemed illegal by the FCC, which asked for full disclosure into the network policies of Comcast.

A 2010 documentary, Barbershop Punk, details the experience of Topolski following his discovery and legal actions against Comcast. Topolski is currently an honorary board member of the New America Foundation, a left-wing think tank where he advises on political issues related to the Internet.
