= Computer language =

Formal language for communicating with a computer

A computer language is a formal language for humans to communicate with a computer, not a natural language. In earlier days of computing (before the 1980s), the term was used interchangeably with programming language, but today, used primarily for taxonomy, is a broader term that encompasses languages that are not programming in nature. Sub-categories (with possibly contended hierarchical relationships) include:

- Construction
  - Programming – for controlling computer behavior
    - Command – for controlling the tasks of a computer, such as starting programs
    - Query – for querying databases and information systems
    - Transformation – for transforming the text of a formal language into text that meets a specific goal
  - Structural
    - Configuration – for writing configuration files
    - Data exchange – examples: JSON, XML
    - Markup – for annotating a document in a way that is syntactically distinguishable from the text, such as HTML
    - Page description – for describing the appearance of a printed page in a higher level than an actual output bitmap
    - Style sheet – for expressing the presentation of structured documents, such as CSS
- Modeling – for designing systems
  - Architecture description – for describing and representing system architecture
  - Hardware description – for modeling integrated circuits
- Simulation – for simulating
- Specification – for describing what a system should do

== See also ==
- Domain-specific language – Programming language specialized to a specific application domain
- Expression language – Domain specific computer language
- General-purpose programming language – Programming language used in many domains
- Lists of programming languages
- Natural language processing – Processing of natural language by a computer
