= Craig Neidorf =

American editor

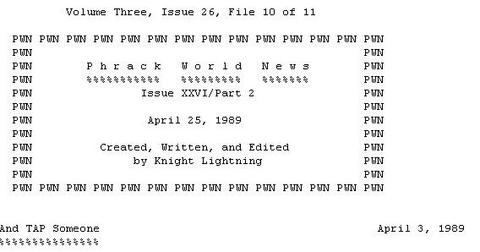
Phrack World News front page

Craig Neidorf (born 1969), a.k.a. Knight Lightning, is an American editor. He was one of the founding editors of Phrack Magazine, an ezine.

In 1990, he was charged for fraud, though later the charges were dropped. The case was a catalyst in the founding of the Electronic Frontier Foundation. Prophet, a witness, admitted that he had never known Neidorf to break in to any computer. Also that no one in the Legion of Doom considered Craig a hacker.

== Biography ==
Craig Neidorf studied at the University of Missouri.

In 1985, Craig, along with Randy Tischler (a.k.a. Taran King), came up with the concept of Phrack and started publishing it since then.

In February 1990, Neidorf was arrested and was charged with fraud and interstate transportation of stolen property for stealing a confidential document, the E911 document, from the Bell South telephone company, and with publicly distributing it in February 1989. BellSouth described the document, on the subject of the inner workings of the Enhanced 911 system, as being worth US$79,449.

The case became a controversial issue for the digital underground and Neidorf's defense was organised, not funded, by the fledgling Electronic Frontier Foundation. On 27 July 1990, the fourth day of trial, the case was dismissed. The charges were dropped when it was revealed that the document was not source code but rather a memorandum and that it could be ordered from BellSouth by phone for $13.50. The proceedings are formally known as United States v. Riggs.

He was not found innocent though the trial was dropped. On September 9, 1991, he was granted motion for the "expungement and sealing" of his indictment record. Craig became determined to become a lawyer. In 2020, he was working as a researcher at Electronic Frontier Foundation.
