= Expression language =

Domain specific computer language

An expression language is a computer language for creating a machine readable representation of specific domain knowledge. Examples include:

- Advanced Boolean Expression Language, an obsolete hardware description language for hardware descriptions
- Data Analysis Expressions (DAX), an expression language developed by Microsoft and used in Power Pivot, among other places
- Jakarta Expression Language, a domain-specific language used in Jakarta EE web applications. Formerly known as "Unified Expression Language", "Expression Language" or just "the Expression Language").
- Rights Expression Languages, machine processable language used for representing immaterial rights such as copyright and license information
