= MySQLi =

PHP driver for MySQL databases

The MySQLi Extension (MySQL Improved) is a relational database driver used in the PHP scripting language to provide an interface with MySQL protocol compatible databases (MariaDB, MySQL, Percona Server, TiDB).

MySQLi is an improved version of the older PHP MySQL driver, offering various benefits. The authors of the PHP scripting language recommend using MySQLi when dealing with MySQL server versions 4.1.3 and newer, since it takes advantage of new functionality.

== Technical details ==
The PHP code consists of a core, with optional extensions to the core functionality. PHP's MySQL-related extensions, such as the MySQLi extension, and the MySQL extension, are implemented using the PHP extension framework.

The MySQLi extension provides various benefits with respect to its predecessor, the most prominent of which (according to the PHP website) are:

- An object-oriented interface
- Support for prepared statements
- Support for multiple statements
- Support for transactions
- Enhanced debugging support

== Comparison of features ==
There are three main API options when considering connecting to a MySQL database server:

- PHP's MySQLi Extension
- PHP Data Objects (PDO)
- PHP's MySQL Extension

	PHP's MySQLi Extension	PDO	PHP's MySQL Extension
PHP version introduced	5.0	5.0	pre-3.0
Included with PHP 5.x	Yes	Yes	Yes
Included with PHP 7.x	Yes	Yes	No
Development status	Active development	Active development as of PHP 5.3	Deprecated as of PHP 5.5; Removed in PHP 7.0
Recommended by MySQL for new projects	Yes - preferred option	Yes	No
API supports Charsets	Yes	Yes	No
API supports server-side Prepared Statements	Yes	Yes	No
API supports client-side Prepared Statements	No	Yes	No
API supports Stored Procedures	Yes	Yes	No
API supports Multiple Statements	Yes	Most	No
Supports all MySQL 4.1+ functionality	Yes	Most	No

== Usage ==
=== Dual interface ===
The MySQLi extension features a dual interface: it supports both the procedural and object-oriented programming paradigms.

Users migrating from the old MySQL extension may prefer the familiarity of the procedural interface; in many cases, the function names differ only by prefix. Some MySQLi functions take a connection handle as their first argument, whereas matching functions in the old MySQL interface took it as an optional last argument.

New and old native function calls

<?php
$mysqli = mysqli_connect("example.com", "user", "password", "database");
$result = mysqli_query($mysqli, "SELECT * FROM myDatabase");
echo mysqli_num_rows($result);

$mysql = mysql_connect("example.com", "user", "password");
mysql_select_db("database");
$result = mysql_query("SELECT * FROM myDatabase", $mysql);
echo mysql_num_rows($result);
?>

=== Connections ===
The MySQL server supports the use of various transport layers for connections. Connections use TCP/IP, Unix domain sockets or Windows named pipes.

The hostname localhost has a special meaning: it is bound to the use of Unix domain sockets. It is not possible to open a TCP/IP connection using the hostname localhost – instead 127.0.0.1 must be used.

Connection examples:

<?php
$mysqli = new mysqli("localhost", "user", "password", "database");
if ($mysqli->connect_errno) {
    echo "Failed to connect to MySQL: (" . $mysqli->connect_errno . ") " . $mysqli->connect_error;
}
echo $mysqli->host_info . "\n";

$mysqli = new mysqli("127.0.0.1", "user", "password", "database", 3306);
if ($mysqli->connect_errno) {
    echo "Failed to connect to MySQL: (" . $mysqli->connect_errno . ") " . $mysqli->connect_error;
}

echo $mysqli->host_info . "\n";
?>

Output

Localhost via UNIX socket
127.0.0.1 via TCP/IP

=== Executing statements ===
Statements can be executed with the mysqli_query(), mysqli_real_query() and mysqli_multi_query() functions. The mysqli_query() function is the most common, and combines the executing statement with a buffered fetch of its result set, if any, in one call. Calling mysqli_query() is identical to calling mysqli_real_query() followed by mysqli_store_result().

Example:

<?php
$mysqli = new mysqli("example.com", "user", "password", "database");
if ($mysqli->connect_errno) {
    echo "Failed to connect to MySQL: (" . $mysqli->connect_errno . ") " . $mysqli->connect_error;
}

if (!$mysqli->query("DROP TABLE IF EXISTS test") ||
    !$mysqli->query("CREATE TABLE test(id INT)") ||
    !$mysqli->query("INSERT INTO test(id) VALUES (1)")) {
    echo "Table creation failed: (" . $mysqli->errno . ") " . $mysqli->error;
}
?>

=== Buffered result sets ===
After statement execution, results can be retrieved at once to be buffered by the client or by read row by row. Client-side result set buffering allows the server to free resources associated with the statement results as early as possible. Generally speaking, clients are slow consuming result sets. Therefore, it is recommended to use buffered result sets. mysqli_query() combines statement execution and result set buffering.

PHP applications can navigate freely through buffered results. Navigation is fast because the result sets are held in client memory.

Example: Navigation through buffered results

<?php
$mysqli = new mysqli("example.com", "user", "password", "database");
if ($mysqli->connect_errno) {
    echo "Failed to connect to MySQL: (" . $mysqli->connect_errno . ") " . $mysqli->connect_error;
}

if (!$mysqli->query("DROP TABLE IF EXISTS test") ||
    !$mysqli->query("CREATE TABLE test(id INT)") ||
    !$mysqli->query("INSERT INTO test(id) VALUES (1), (2), (3)")) {
    echo "Table creation failed: (" . $mysqli->errno . ") " . $mysqli->error;
}

$res = $mysqli->query("SELECT id FROM test ORDER BY id ASC");

echo "Reverse order...\n";
for ($row_no = $res->num_rows - 1; $row_no >= 0; $row_no--) {
    $res->data_seek($row_no);
    $row = $res->fetch_assoc();
    echo " id = " . $row['id'] . "\n";
}

echo "Result set order...\n";
$res->data_seek(0);
while ($row = $res->fetch_assoc()) {
    echo " id = " . $row['id'] . "\n";
}
?>

The above example will output:

Reverse order...
 id = 3
 id = 2
 id = 1
Result set order...
 id = 1
 id = 2
 id = 3

=== Unbuffered result sets ===
If client memory is a short resource and freeing server resources as early as possible to keep server load low is not needed, unbuffered results can be used. Scrolling through unbuffered results is not possible before all rows have been read.

Example: Navigation through unbuffered results

<?php
$mysqli->real_query("SELECT id FROM test ORDER BY id ASC");
$res = $mysqli->use_result();

echo "Result set order...\n";
while ($row = $res->fetch_assoc()) {
    echo " id = " . $row['id'] . "\n";
}
?>

=== Result set values data types ===
The mysqli_query(), mysqli_real_query() and mysqli_multi_query() functions are used to execute non-prepared statements. At the level of the MySQL Client Server Protocol, the command COM_QUERY and the text protocol are used for statement execution. With the text protocol, the MySQL server converts all data of a result sets into strings before sending. This conversion is done regardless of the SQL result set column data type. The MySQL client libraries receive all column values as strings. No further client-side casting is done to convert columns back to their native types. Instead, all values are provided as PHP strings.

Example: Text protocol returns strings by default

<?php
$mysqli = new mysqli("example.com", "user", "password", "database");
if ($mysqli->connect_errno) {
    echo "Failed to connect to MySQL: (" . $mysqli->connect_errno . ") " . $mysqli->connect_error;
}

if (!$mysqli->query("DROP TABLE IF EXISTS test") ||
    !$mysqli->query("CREATE TABLE test(id INT, label CHAR(1))") ||
    !$mysqli->query("INSERT INTO test(id, label) VALUES (1, 'a')")) {
    echo "Table creation failed: (" . $mysqli->errno . ") " . $mysqli->error;
}

$res = $mysqli->query("SELECT id, label FROM test WHERE id = 1");
$row = $res->fetch_assoc();

printf("id = %s (%s)\n", $row['id'], gettype($row['id']));
printf("label = %s (%s)\n", $row['label'], gettype($row['label']));
?>

The above example will output:

id = 1 (string)
label = a (string)

It is possible to convert integer and float columns back to PHP numbers by setting the MYSQLI_OPT_INT_AND_FLOAT_NATIVE connection option, if using the mysqlnd library. If set, the mysqlnd library will check the result set meta data column types and convert numeric SQL columns to PHP numbers, if the PHP data type value range allows for it. This way, for example, SQL INT columns are returned as integers.

Example: Native data types with mysqlnd and connection option

<?php
$mysqli = mysqli_init();
$mysqli->options(MYSQLI_OPT_INT_AND_FLOAT_NATIVE, 1);
$mysqli->real_connect("example.com", "user", "password", "database");

if ($mysqli->connect_errno) {
    echo "Failed to connect to MySQL: (" . $mysqli->connect_errno . ") " . $mysqli->connect_error;
}

if (!$mysqli->query("DROP TABLE IF EXISTS test") ||
    !$mysqli->query("CREATE TABLE test(id INT, label CHAR(1))") ||
    !$mysqli->query("INSERT INTO test(id, label) VALUES (1, 'a')")) {
    echo "Table creation failed: (" . $mysqli->errno . ") " . $mysqli->error;
}

$res = $mysqli->query("SELECT id, label FROM test WHERE id = 1");
$row = $res->fetch_assoc();

printf("id = %s (%s)\n", $row['id'], gettype($row['id']));
printf("label = %s (%s)\n", $row['label'], gettype($row['label']));
?>

The above example will output:

id = 1 (integer)
label = a (string)

=== Prepared statements ===
The MySQL database supports prepared statements. A prepared statement or a parameterized statement is used to execute the same statement repeatedly with high efficiency.

The prepared statement execution consists of two stages: prepare and execute. At the prepare stage a statement template is sent to the database server. The server performs a syntax check and initializes server internal resources for later use.

The MySQL server supports using anonymous, positional placeholders with ?.

=== Stored procedures ===
The MySQL database supports stored procedures. A stored procedure is a subroutine stored in the database catalog. Applications can call and execute the stored procedure. The CALL SQL statement is used to execute a stored procedure.

Stored procedures can have IN, INOUT and OUT parameters, depending on the MySQL version. The MySQLi interface has no special notion for the different kinds of parameters.

Input parameters are provided with the CALL statement.

=== Multiple statements ===
MySQL optionally allows having multiple statements in one statement string. Sending multiple statements at once reduces client-server round trips but requires special handling.

Multiple statements or multi queries must be executed with mysqli_multi_query(). The individual statements of the statement string are separated by semicolons. Then, all result sets returned by the executed statements must be fetched.

The MySQL server allows having statements that do return result sets and statements that do not return result sets in one multiple statement.

=== API support for transactions ===
The MySQL server supports transactions depending on the storage engine used. Since MySQL 5.5, the default storage engine is InnoDB. InnoDB has full ACID transaction support.

Transactions can either be controlled using SQL or API calls. It is recommended to use API calls for enabling and disabling the auto commit mode and for committing and rolling back transactions.

=== Metadata ===
A MySQL result set contains metadata. The metadata describes the columns found in the result set. All metadata sent by MySQL is accessible through the MySQLi interface. The extension performs no or negligible changes to the information it receives. Differences between MySQL server versions are not aligned.

Meta data is accessed through the mysqli_result interface.

== The MySQLi extension and persistent connections ==
Persistent connection support was introduced in PHP 5.3 for the MySQLi extension. Support was already present in PDO MYSQL and ext/mysql. The idea behind persistent connections is that a connection between a client process and a database can be reused by a client process, rather than being created and destroyed multiple times. This reduces the overhead of creating fresh connections every time one is required, as unused connections are cached and ready to be reused.

Unlike the MySQL extension, MySQLi does not provide a separate function for opening persistent connections. To open a persistent connection you must prepend p: to the hostname when connecting.

The problem with persistent connections is that they can be left in unpredictable states by clients. For example, a table lock might be activated before a client terminates unexpectedly. A new client process reusing this persistent connection will get the connection "as is". Any cleanup would need to be done by the new client process before it could make good use of the persistent connection, increasing the burden on the programmer.

The persistent connection of the MySQLi extension however provides built-in cleanup handling code. The cleanup carried out by MySQLi includes:

- Rollback active transactions
- Close and drop temporary tables
- Unlock tables
- Reset session variables
- Close prepared statements (always happens with PHP)
- Close handler
- Release locks acquired with GET_LOCK()

This ensures that persistent connections are in a clean state on return from the connection pool, before the client process uses them.

The MySQLi extension does this cleanup by automatically calling the C-API function mysql_change_user().

The automatic cleanup feature has advantages and disadvantages though. The advantage is that the developer no longer needs to worry about adding cleanup code, as it is called automatically. However, the disadvantage is that the code could potentially be a little slower, as the code to perform the cleanup needs to run each time a connection is returned from the connection pool.

It is possible to switch off the automatic cleanup code, by compiling PHP with MYSQLI_NO_CHANGE_USER_ON_PCONNECT defined.
