= Phrack =

Online hacking magazine

- The introduction to Phrack, issue 1
- Editor: The Phrack Staff
- Former editors: Taran King; Cheap Shades; Knight Lightning; Shooting Shark; Elric of Imrryr; Crimson Death; Dispater; Erik Bloodaxe; Voyager daemon9/route Phrackstaff; Circle of the Lost Hackers; The Phrack Staff; Phrack Staff
- Categories: Hacking/computer science, phreaking
- Frequency: No set frequency
- First issue: November 17, 1985
- Based in: Worldwide
- Language: English
- Website: phrack.org
- ISSN: 1068-1035

Phrack is an e-zine written by and for hackers, first published on November 17, 1985. It has a wide circulation which includes both hackers and computer security professionals.

Originally covering subjects related to phreaking, anarchy, and cracking, its articles now also cover a wide range of topics including cyber security, physical security, hacking, cryptography, counter culture, and international news.

Phrack has been described as having "its finger on the pulse of hacker culture", and being "hugely influential in the early days of hacker culture".

The magazine is run and published by a team of international volunteers and security professionals. It is available for free.

== Publications ==
=== E-Zine Releases ===
Issues of Phrack are divided in volumes, covering one or more years of publication. Phrack's latest issue is #72.

Volume	Year	Issues	Editors
01	1985-86	#1 to #9	Taran King; Cheap Shades
02	1987-88	#10 to #24	Taran King; Knight Lightning; Shooting Shark; Elric of Imrryr; Crimson Death
03	1989-91	#25 to #36	Taran King; Crimson Death; Dispater
04	1992-93	#37 to #44	Dispater; Erik Bloodaxe
05-06	1994-95	#45 to #47	Erik Bloodaxe
07	1996-97	#48 to #51	Voyager daemon9/route
08-10	1998-00	#52 to #56	route
11	2001-05	#57 to #63	Phrackstaff
12-13	2007-09	#64 to #66	The Circle of Lost Hackers
14-16	2010-21	#67 to #70	The Phrack Staff
17	2024-	#71 to #72	Phrack Staff

=== Hardcopy Releases ===
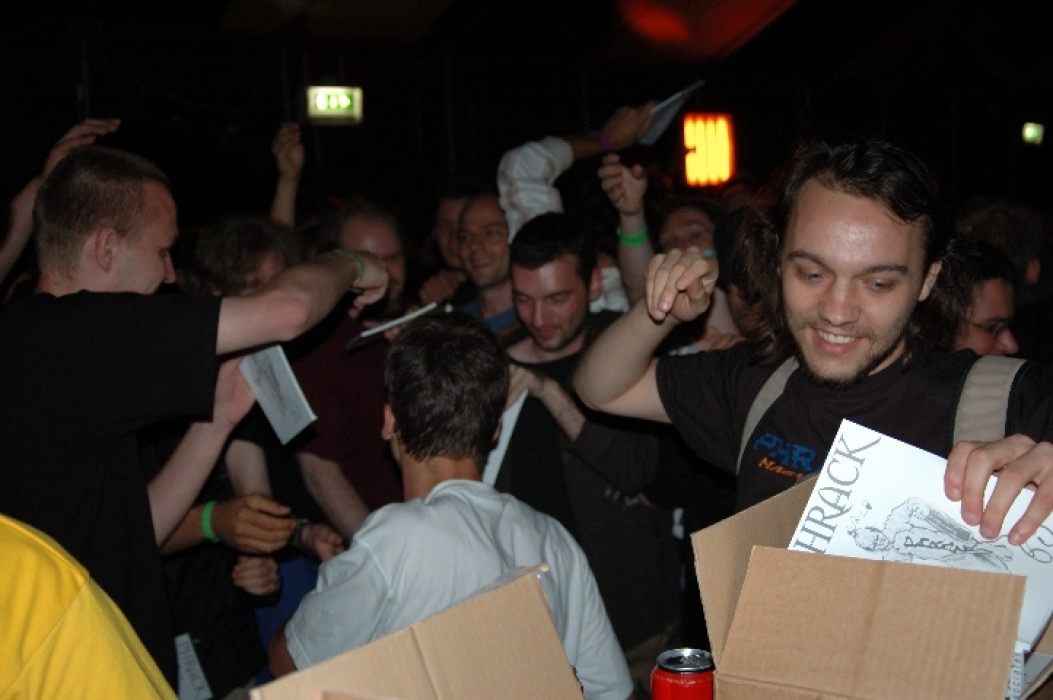
Phrack #63 Release Party at WTH 2005

So far, there have been five major hardcopy releases and various smaller "special edition" hardcopy releases.

Each major hardcopy release contains most (but not all) articles of the e-zine release. The printed edition is always released at hacker conferences/camps and always for free and usually a few days before the online release.

Occasionally, Phrack releases a "special edition" hardcopy as well. These are smaller editions, containing three classic articles, three rejected articles (also known as "Off The Record" articles), and three articles from the upcoming release.

Issue	Year	Place	Front Cover
57	2001	Hackers At Large (The Netherlands)	
62	2004	RuxCon (Australia)	
63	2005	What the Hack (The Netherlands)	
71	2024	DefCon 32	
72	2025	WHY (The Netherlands); DefCon 33 (Las Vegas); HOPE (New York)	

== History ==
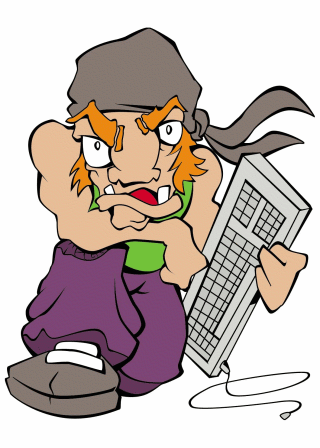
Phrack mascot used on merchandise.

Phrack, first released on November 17, 1985, takes its name from the words "phreak" and "hack". The founding editors of the magazine, known by the pseudonyms "Taran King" and "Knight Lightning", edited most of the first thirty editions. Editions were originally released onto the Metal Shop bulletin board system, where Taran King was a sysop, and widely mirrored by other boards. Its headquarters was in Austin, Texas.

During its first ten years of publication, Phrack was largely associated with telecommunications fraud, providing material for phreakers and information about arrests in the community through its Phrack World News feature articles. Along with the release of articles such as "Smashing The Stack For Fun And Profit" and the editorship of daemon9/route in 1996, Phrack's orientation shifted toward computer security and its focus drew closer to the current definition of hacking (Cybersecurity).

=== Arrest of Knight Lightning ===
The 24th issue of Phrack, released February 1989, included a document relating to the workings of Enhanced 911 emergency response systems. This was an administrative document describing which parts of the organization are responsible for what parts of the E911 system. It had been copied from a BellSouth computer and played a major part in a series of Secret Service raids called Operation Sundevil and is featured in Bruce Sterling's book The Hacker Crackdown. Phrack's editor, Knight Lightning, was arrested and charged with access device fraud and transportation of stolen property. The proceedings which ensued are known formally as United States v. Riggs, named for Knight Lightning's co-defendant Robert Riggs.

The Electronic Frontier Foundation filed an amicus brief supporting Knight Lightning, and helped to get the case dropped by introducing a witness who showed that Bellcore was selling more detailed documentation to the E911 system for as little as $13 to anyone who asked. The E911 document had initially been valued by the prosecution at almost $80,000. The case was then dropped.

=== Pre-2000 ===
After the arrest of Knight Lightning, and the shutdown of Phrack by the US Secret Service in late December 1989 a few weeks after issue #30 was released, some attempts were made to resurrect Phrack under the editorship of Doc Holiday and Crimson Death. However, the lack of consent from the original editor to accept this Phrack Classic led to a new editorship for issue #33 by Dispater under the name Diet Phrack until issue #41.

Issue #42 was released under the editorship of Erik Bloodaxe in 1992. In September 1994, the first Phrack website appeared with release #46, containing all of the files from the previous issues.

With the growing use of the Internet and interest in computer security, from 1996 Phrack became increasingly oriented toward computer security. The editorship was handed to route along with voyager until 2000 (release #56). During this period, the Phrack website was defaced several times and the magazine was often unavailable.

=== 2000-2006 ===
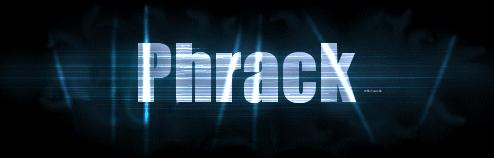
Phrack logo used on Phrack's website.

Since 2001 Phrack has been edited under the alias Phrackstaff.

In 2005, it was announced that the current staff would retire, with the 63rd issue being its last release. A new leadership was expected to start releasing sometime in 2006/2007.

To commemorate Phrack's final appearance, the 63rd issue was to be a hardback edition, released simultaneously at the DEF CON and What the Hack conventions on the 29th July 2005. An e-zine version of the release followed on a few days thereafter. The printer for the hardcopies of Phrack to be distributed at Defcon refused to fulfil the order once they realized that they were printing a hacking book. Two University of Arizona students filled the gap and printed between 100 and 200 copies of Phrack 63 in time for release at Defcon 13. The copies of Phrack 63 distributed at Defcon 13 are each stamped with a "serial" number on the inside of the last page. It is believed that there were 100 numbered copies of Phrack 63 distributed at Defcon. All copies were hand cut and bound; unnumbered copies may be unreleased "extras", or may have cutting errors that meant they were deemed them unfit for distribution.

=== 2007-2009 ===
Issue 63 told readers to "expect a new release", and on May 27, 2007, issue 64 was released by a new board of editors who called themselves "The Circle of Lost Hackers" (TCLH). It consisted of a few old staff members and mostly new members. TCLH released four issues up until #66, released on June 11, 2009.

=== 2010-2023 ===
The editorship passed to a new staff who did four releases. The magazine declined in popularity. In 2023, the existing staff contacted many ancient staff members (all the way back to 1995: Route, Skyper, Grugq, Mayhem, ...) to discuss to continuation of Phrack or to shut it down for good.

It was decided to find a new editorial staff and to keep Phrack going. A new team was found. Some of the ancient staff joined as advisors.

=== 2024 onwards ===
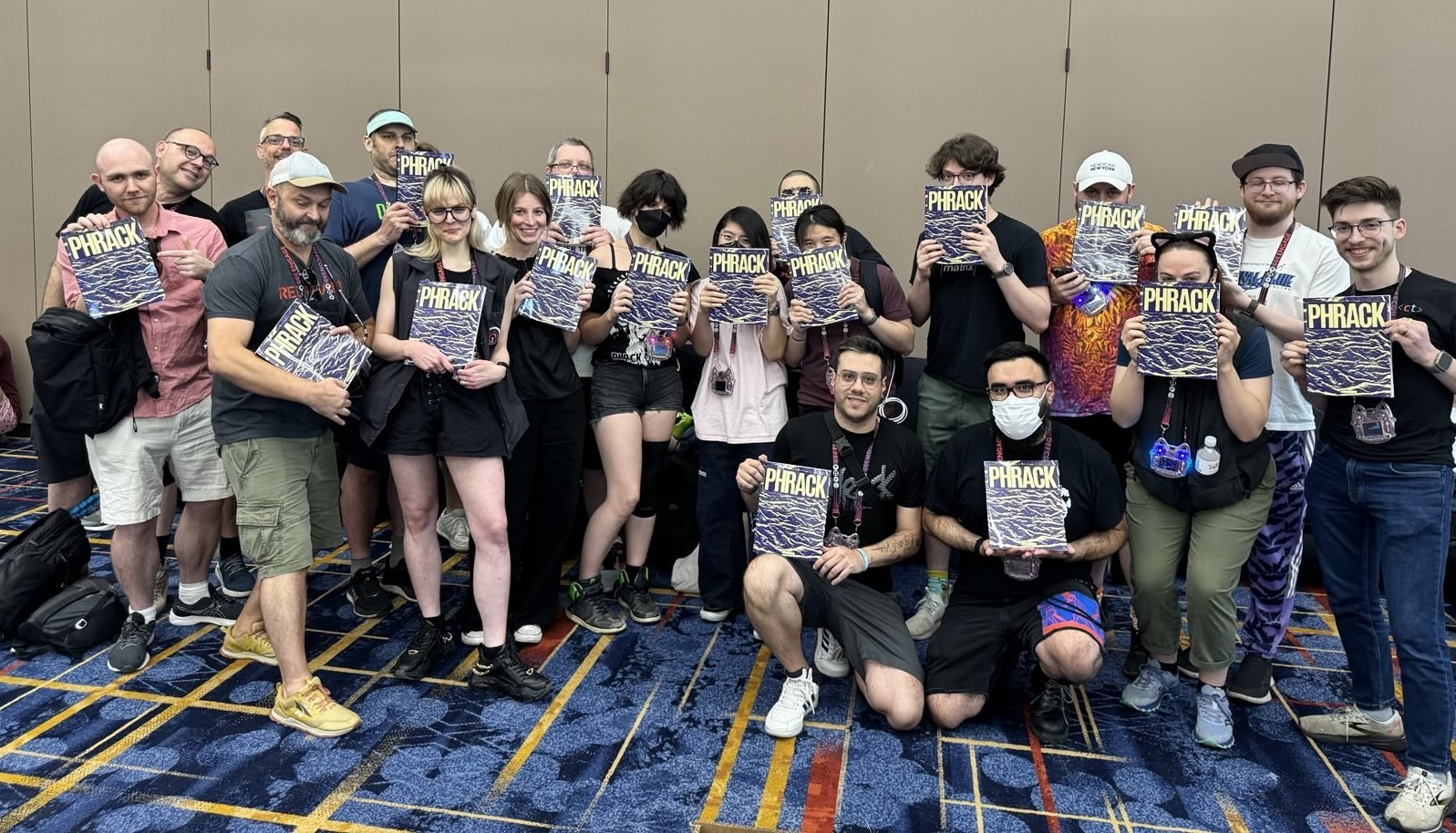
Phrack #71 release at DefCon 32

Issue #71 was released as a hardcopy and an eZine on the 19th of August 2024.

Issue #72 marked the 40th anniversary of the magazine and was celebrated with a massive release of around 15,000 printed editions and distributed (for free) at multiple hacker conferences around the world.

== Content ==
Phrack issues are released irregularly, and the issues are grouped into volumes. Each issue comprises a number of Philes: Stand-alone text files of technical or counter-cultural content. Philes are submitted by members of the hacker underground community, and are reviewed by the editors for publication.

In addition to technical articles, Phrack also provides a focus for news and gossip among the hacker community.

At the 1990 National Computer Security Conference, Sheldon Zenner and Dorothy Denning suggested that Phrack articles contain the same factual content found in other computer and security magazines, but differed in tone.

=== Notable articles ===
Phrack is especially popular due to the high technical standard of its releases compared to other cybersecurity publications and has made its reputation from a number of high-quality articles.

- "\/\The Conscience of a Hacker/\/" (aka the Hacker Manifesto), written by The Mentor has been an inspiration to young hackers since the 1980s, it was published in the 7th issue of Phrack.
- "Smashing The Stack For Fun And Profit", written by Aleph One, published in issue 49, is the "classic paper" on stack buffer overflows, partly responsible for popularizing the vulnerability.
- "The Art of Scanning", written by Fyodor, published September 1, 1997 in Issue 51 introduced the nmap Internet scanning tool.
- "Vudo Malloc Tricks", written by MaXX and "Once Upon a free()", were both published in Issue 57.

=== Regular features ===
Several regular columns are present in most issues of Phrack, such as:

- Prophile - a profile of an influential individual from the hacking underground.
- Linenoise - a collection of smaller, often more practical articles.
- Loopback - answers to emails received by the Phrack staff.
- Phrack World News - a compilation of reports on the latest counter-culture events.
- International Scenes - a compilation of testimonies from hackers around the world focusing on national and international activities.

=== Challenge Coin ===
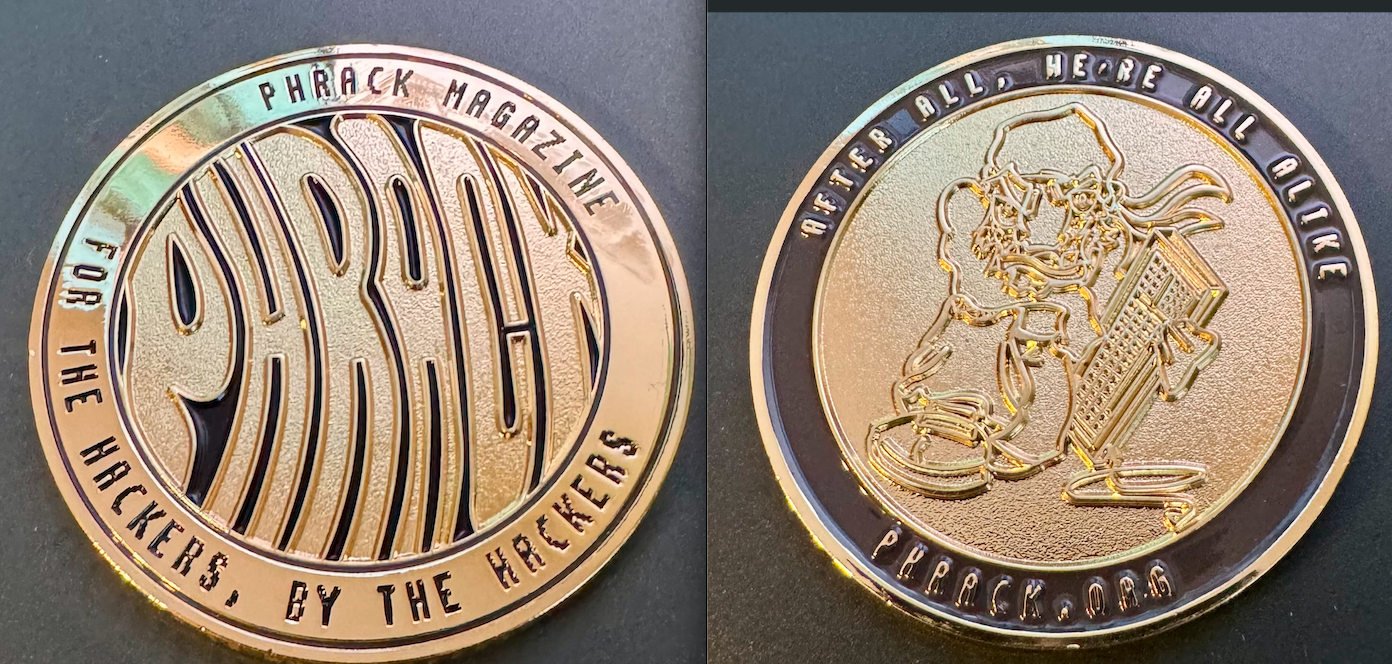
Phrack Challenge Coin

In 2025, a limited edition of fifty golden "Challenge Coins" were created. These coins are given exclusively to past and future authors.

The engraving on the rim reads: "I am a hacker, and this is my manifesto. You may stop this individual, but you can't stop us all..."
