= Military computer =

Overview of US military computer use

This article specifically addresses U.S. armed forces military computers and their use.

== History ==
Some of the earliest computers were military computers. Military requirements for portability and ruggedness led to some of the earliest transistorized computers, such as the 1958 AN/USQ-17, the 1959 AN/MYK-1 (MOBIDIC), the 1960 M18 FADAC, and the 1962 D-17B; the earliest integrated-circuit based computer, the 1964 D-37C; as well as one of the earliest laptop computers, the 1982 Grid Compass. Military requirements for a computer small enough to fit through a submarine's hatch led to the AN/UYK-1.

== Construction ==
Typically a military computer is much more robust than an industrial computer enclosure. Most electronics will be protected with a layer of conformal coating. There will be more structure inside to support the components, the plug-in cards will be individually supported and secured to assure they do not pop out of their sockets, the processor and heat sink will be secured, memory will be glued into their sockets, and so forth. This is to assure nothing moves during the shock events.

There are several differentiators between military computers and typical office or consumer computers:

- Cost
- Intended environment
- Long term availability
- Architecture
- Feature set

Cost – Military computers are generally much more expensive than office/consumer computers. Consumer computers from manufacturers such as Dell are manufactured in very high quantities which leads to lower costs due to economy of scale. Military programs, on the other hand, can require small numbers of systems leading to higher costs. Military computers will typically also be constructed of more robust materials with more internal structure, more cooling fans, a more robust power supply, and so forth.

Intended Environment – An office or consumer computer is intended for use in a very controlled shirt-sleeve environment with moderate temperatures and humidity and minimal dust. A military computer can be designed to operate in very adverse environments with extremes of temperature such as -4F to +149F (-20C to +65C) operating, 5% to 95% humidity levels, and high dust loading in the air as well as other insults to the hardware. They may be required to operate in high salt environments such as on a ship or designed for high shock and vibration such as on a ship or submarine. Military computers may be intended for installation on aircraft in which case they need to be crash worthy and able to operate at high altitudes if in unpressurized aircraft. The same computer may be required to operate in Afghanistan as well as in Alaska with no change in the design.

Long Term Availability – Military programs last years and identical replacement hardware may be required over the life of the program. Consumer computers are often driven by the latest and greatest to realize the highest possible performance, such as required to play games. The motherboard in a consumer grade computer may have an availability measured in months instead of years or decades. In a consumer level computer, over the lifetime of the product availability, it is not unheard of for all the components such as the motherboard, drives, BIOS, video board, etc., to be different from computer to computer. That is not acceptable in a military computer for which supporting documents have been created and systems tested and approved.

Architecture – There are many types of computer architecture. The most common that people know of is the PC as created by IBM. Many military computer systems are built around alternative plug-in bus structures such as VMEbus or Compact PCI. A military computer may not provide for plug-in cards and be in a dedicated form factor for a specific application such as installation on a UAV such as the Global Hawk.

Feature Set – A military computer may have features not found on a consumer grade computer such as Circular connectors, hot swap power supplies, hot swap fans, custom front panel features such as LCD displays, and so forth.

== MIL standards and specifications ==
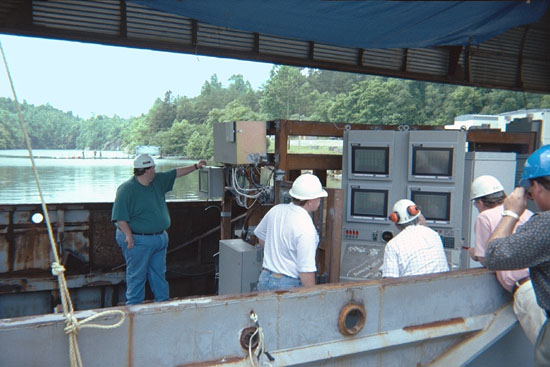
Barge Explosion Test Preparation

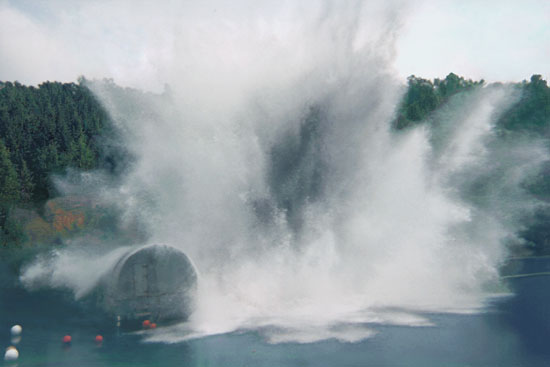
Actual Barge Explosion Test

The Armed Forces have many numerical designations for computers or other equipment, to guide the military buyer's choice of appropriate technology for their application. For instance, MIL-S-901D would indicate that the computer passed shock and vibration requirements of specific tests for Navy installation. Some of these tests are specific to application usage, such as barge explosion testing, which simulates a torpedo hit and subsequent high peak shock to a ship on which the computer is installed. The "gold standard" of testing for compliance with 901D is the Barge Test. A Barge Test is performed four times, each time placing 60 lbs HBX-1 explosive 24 feet under water, starting at 40 feet away, then at 30, 25 and finally 20 feet. In addition, the tests are performed in a fore-and-aft orientation to simulate an explosion at the bow or stern of the ship and athwartship to simulate an explosion by the side of the ship.

Other more common requirements are MIL-STD-810 for environmental testing such as storage and operating temperature, humidity, salt spray, dirt, etc. Another common specification is MIL-STD-461 for electromagnetic compatibility. There are specifications for workmanship, wiring, packaging, and so forth, that military computers are required to meet.

More on MIL Standards and Specifications at Defense Standard.

== Security Standards & Specifications ==
To meet the challenges of defending the U.S. cyber network, the U.S. military has taken steps to improve the security of devices connected to Department of Defense information networks. According to United States Cyber Command, "Cyber threats demand new approaches to managing information, securing information, and ensuring our ability to operate."

All military computers must conform to the latest FIPS 140 standards (FIPS 140-2) which specify the latest requirements for cryptography modules on devices used throughout the U.S. government. FIPS 140-3, currently under development, will address new requirements to face existing threats, including software security and an additional level of security.

To address the risks associated with the increasing prevalence of commercial mobile devices (CMDs), a DoD Inspector General report from March 2013 identifies improvements necessary to track and configure commercial mobile devices to meet Army compliance standards. The report identifies existing gaps in tracking and sanitization for over 14,000 CMDs, recommending a "clear and comprehensive policy to include requirements for reporting and tracking all commercial mobile devices purchased under pilot and non-pilot programs."

== Field risks ==
The progress of small-scale computer technology in military applications was initially slow due to concerns about security and the ability to survive rugged environments and enemy weaponry. PC-based technology in the 20th century was not robust enough to withstand combat conditions and severe environments.

Hazards in the field include water and corrosives, sand and wind, extreme temperatures, high shock and vibration, power interruptions, susceptibility to EMI/RFI radiation, etc. Also, operator interface was complex, and most operating systems were not fast in operation, or easy to learn and use in pressure situations.

In the last decade, improvements in design and operator interface have resulted in new mandates for the use of small computer technology in the military. Some of the improvements have migrated over from home and business computing. Others have migrated over from industrial computing, where designs for environments such as Zone 1 hazardous areas in oil & gas exploration have been modified for army and navy environments.

- Sealed enclosures using materials such as cast aluminum with magnesium have improved environmental resistance to contaminants and hazards, including EMI-burst weaponry.
- Low-heat CPU designs have made sealed enclosures possible even for environments like the desert or naval bridge wing display under the open sun.
- Advances like flash memory have eliminated moving parts and reduced mechanical failures.
- Simpler, effective OS software has improved the operator interface and speed of execution, while reducing OS failures.

== Future computer use in the military ==
In the last 20 years, wide acceptance of small-scale computer technology in the military has occurred, and is likely to increase greatly. Confidence has improved in the ability of equipment to withstand combat and extreme environment conditions. Most importantly, modern combat has become a duel of speed. Faster and more technologically advanced weaponry demonstrates first-strike capability in current combat situations, which is likely only to encourage further implementation of computer technology into systems used in the UK Armed Forces in the future.

Various branches of the military have mandated that future systems will be based on Zero Client or Thin Client technology.

== See also ==
- Rugged computer
- Secure cryptoprocessors
- Gun data computer
