= CPA =

CPA may refer to:

== Organizations ==
=== Politics and government ===
- Christian Peoples Alliance, a political party in the UK
- Coalition Provisional Authority, a transitional government of Iraq 2003–04
- Coalition for a Prosperous America, a US manufacturing industry lobbying group
- Commonwealth Parliamentary Association
- Communist Party of America, forerunner of Communist Party USA
- Communist Party of Arakan, in Burma
- Communist Party of Australia, 1920–1991
  - Communist Party of Australia (1971)
- Comprehensive Peace Accord, a 2006 agreement in Nepal
- Comprehensive Peace Agreement, a 2005 agreement in Sudan
- Comprehensive Performance Assessment, a UK Audit Commission assessment
- Comprehensive Plan of Action, a 1989 plan to stop the influx of Indochinese boat people
- Congress Party Alliance, a political party in the Republic of China (Taiwan)
- Council of Presidential Advisers, in Singapore
- Cyprus Ports Authority

=== Other organizations ===
- CPA Australia, a professional accounting body
- CPA Canada, a professional accounting body
- Canadian Payments Association
- Canadian Payroll Association
- Canadian Police Association
- Canadian Poolplayers Association
- Canadian Psychological Association
- Catholic Patriotic Association, a Catholic organization in China
- Centre de perfectionnement aux affaires
- Chinese Progressive Association (Boston), in the US
- College Park Academy, in Riverdale Park, Maryland, US
- Commission on Preservation and Access, now Council on Library and Information Resources, in the US
- Consumer Protection Association, in Myanmar
- CPA (agriculture) (Cooperativa de Producción Agropecuaria), a type of agricultural cooperative in Cuba
- Craft Potters Association, in the UK

== Project management and cost analysis ==
- Cost per action, an online advertising measurement and pricing model
- Cost per activity, an internet marketing cost policy
- Critical path analysis, an algorithm for scheduling a set of project activities
- Customer profitability analysis

== Qualifications ==
- Chartered Patent Attorney, in the UK
- Certified Practising Accountant, in Australia
- Chartered Professional Accountant, in Canada
- Certified Public Accountant, in the US

== Science and technology ==
=== Medicine and health care ===
- Care Programme Approach, a British system of delivering community mental health services
- Cerebellopontine angle, in the brain
- Chronic pulmonary aspergillosis, a long-term fungal infection
- Collaborative practice agreement, a legal document between pharmacists and physicians in the US
- N^{6}-Cyclopentyladenosine, a drug
- Cyproterone acetate, a medication

=== Information technology ===
- Chosen-plaintext attack, an attack model for cryptanalysis
- Co-citation Proximity Analysis, a document similarity measure
- Collaboration Protocol Agreement, a component of the ebXML standards
- Commercial Product Assurance, a form of information security validation

=== Other uses in science and technology ===
- Chirped pulse amplification, a technique for amplifying an ultrashort laser pulse
- Closest point of approach, measured by marine radar
- Coherent perfect absorber, a device which absorbs coherent light
- Coherent potential approximation, a method in physics of finding Green's function
- Chiral phosphoric acid, esters of phosphoric acid
- Cyclopropane fatty acid, a subgroup of fatty acids
- CPA superfamily, of transport proteins

== Sports ==
- Canadian Pickleball Association, a pro sports tour
- Climate Pledge Arena, a multi-purpose indoor arena in Seattle, Washington

== Other uses ==
- Cathay Pacific, ICAO airline code CPA
- Centre for the Performing Arts, Adelaide, a former college in Adelaide, South Australia
- Certified Public Assassins, a team featured on Extreme Dodgeball
- Classification of Products by Activity, a European standard classification of goods and services
- Código Postal Argentino, postal codes in Argentina
- Community Postal Agent, of Australia Post
- Community Preservation Act, a state law in Massachusetts, US
- Continuous partial attention, a term coined by Linda Stone in 1998 to describe a kind of multitasking
- Continuous payment authority, a type of regular automatic payment

== See also ==
- PAC (disambiguation)
