= Solaris Trusted Extensions =

Security extensions for Solaris operating system

Solaris Trusted Extensions is a set of security extensions incorporated in the Solaris 10 operating system by Sun Microsystems, featuring a mandatory access control model. It succeeds Trusted Solaris, a family of security-evaluated operating systems based on earlier versions of Solaris.

Solaris 10 5/09 is Common Criteria certified at Evaluation Assurance Level EAL4+ against the CAPP, RBACPP, and LSPP protection profiles.

== Overview ==
Certain Trusted Solaris features, such as fine-grained privileges, are now part of the standard Solaris 10 release. Beginning with Solaris 10 11/06, Solaris now includes a component called Solaris Trusted Extensions which gives it the additional features necessary to position it as the successor to Trusted Solaris. Inclusion of these features in the mainstream Solaris release marks a significant change from Trusted Solaris, as it is no longer necessary to use a different Solaris release with a modified kernel for labeled security environments. Solaris Trusted Extensions is an OpenSolaris project.

Trusted Extensions additions and enhancements include:

- Accounting
- Role-Based Access Control
- Auditing
- Device Allocation
- Mandatory Access Control Labeling

Solaris Trusted Extensions enforce a mandatory access control policy on all aspects of the operating system, including device access, file, networking, print and window management services. This is achieved by adding sensitivity labels to objects, thereby establishing explicit relationships between these objects. Only appropriate (and explicit) authorization allows applications and users read and/or write access to the objects.

The component also provides labeled security features in a desktop environment. Apart from extending support for the Common Desktop Environment from the Trusted Solaris 8 release, it delivers the first labeled environment based on GNOME. Solaris Trusted Extensions facilitate the access of data at multiple classification levels through a single desktop environment.

Solaris Trusted Extensions also delivers labeled device access and labeled network communication (through the CIPSO standard). CIPSO is used to pass security information within and between labeled zones. Solaris Trusted Extensions complies with the Federal Information Processing Standard (FIPS).

== Trusted Solaris history ==
- 1999 Trusted Solaris 7
- 1996 Trusted Solaris 2.5.1 - ITSEC Certified for E3 / F-B1
- 1995 Trusted Solaris 1.2 - ITSEC Certified for E3 / F-B1
- 1992 SunOS Compartmented Mode Workstation 1.0 - ITSEC Certified for E3 / F-B1
- 1990 SunOS Multilevel Security 1.0 - TCSEC Conformance (1985 Orange Book)
