= Coloured Books =

Coloured Books may refer to:

- Rainbow Books, a set of standards defining the formats for compact discs
- Rainbow Series, is a series of computer security standards and guidelines. Largely superseded by the Common Criteria.
- Coloured Book protocols, a set of network protocols used primarily on the UK academic network before the widespread adoption of TCP/IP
