= Green Hills Software =

American software company

Green Hills Software Inc.
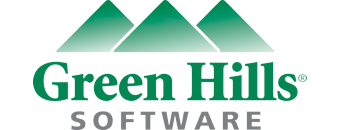
- Type: Private
- Industry: Embedded system software tools
- Founded: 1982; 44 years ago
- Founders: Dan O'Dowd; Carl Rosenberg
- Headquarters: Santa Barbara, California, United States
- Key people: Dan O'Dowd, president
- Products: Operating systems; Programming tools
- Website: www.ghs.com

Green Hills Software is a privately owned company that builds operating systems and programming tools for embedded systems. The firm was founded in 1982 by Dan O'Dowd and Carl Rosenberg. Its headquarters are in Santa Barbara, California.

== History ==
In the 1990s, Green Hills Software and Wind River Systems, both makers of embedded system software development tools, entered into a 99-year agreement to cooperatively support customers using products from both companies. The agreement was terminated after a lawsuit in 2005. After parting ways, Wind River publicly embraced Linux and open-source software while Green Hills initiated a public relations campaign decrying the use of open-source software in projects related to national security.

In 2008, the Green Hills real-time operating system (RTOS) named Integrity-178 was the first system to be certified by the National Information Assurance Partnership (NIAP), composed of National Security Agency (NSA) and National Institute of Standards and Technology (NIST), to Evaluation Assurance Level (EAL) 6+.

In November 2008, it was announced that a commercialized version of Integrity 178-B would be offered to the private sector by Integrity Global Security, a subsidiary of Green Hills Software.

On March 27, 2012, a contract was announced between Green Hills Software and Nintendo. This designates MULTI as the official integrated development environment and toolchain for Nintendo and its licensed developers to program the Wii U video game console.

On February 25, 2014, it was announced that the operating system Integrity had been chosen by Urban Aeronautics for their AirMule flying car unmanned aerial vehicle (UAV), since renamed the Tactical Robotics Cormorant.

== Selected products ==
=== Real-time operating systems ===
Integrity is a POSIX real-time operating system (RTOS). An Integrity variant, named Integrity-178B, was certified to Common Criteria Evaluation Assurance Level (EAL) 6+, High Robustness in November 2008. Micro Velosity (stylized as μ-velOSity) is a real-time microkernel for resource-constrained devices.

=== Compilers ===
Green Hills produces compilers for the programming languages C, C++, Fortran, and Ada. They are cross-platform, for 32- and 64-bit microprocessors, including RISC-V, ARM, Blackfin, ColdFire, MIPS, PowerPC, SuperH, StarCore, x86, V850, and XScale.

=== Integrated development environments ===
MULTI is an integrated development environment (IDE) for the programming languages C, C++, Embedded C++ (EC++), and Ada, aimed at embedded engineers.

TimeMachine is a set of tools for optimizing and debugging C and C++ software. TimeMachine (introduced 2003) supports reverse debugging, a feature that later also became available in the free GNU Debugger (GDB) 7.0 (2009).
