= Canadian Trusted Computer Product Evaluation Criteria =

Communications Security Establishment standard

The Canadian Trusted Computer Product Evaluation Criteria (CTCPEC) is a computer security standard published in 1993 by the Communications Security Establishment to provide an evaluation criterion on IT products. It is a combination of the TCSEC (also called Orange Book) and the European ITSEC approaches.

CTCPEC led to the creation of the Common Criteria standard.

The Canadian System Security Centre, part of the Communications Security Establishment was founded in 1988 to establish a Canadian computer security standard. The Centre published a draft of the standard in April 1992. The final version was published in January 1993.
