= CCTL =

CCTL may refer to:

- Common Criteria Testing Laboratory
- Command Completion Time Limit
