= National Association of Testing Authorities =

Australian accrediting body for analytical laboratories

The National Association of Testing Authorities (NATA) is the recognised national accreditation authority for analytical laboratories and testing service providers in Australia. It is an independent, not-for-profit organisation, governed by a board of directors that has representation from NATA members, industry, government and professional bodies.

NATA was established in 1947 in response to a call for the formation of a national testing services body to ensure the munitions which the government was manufacturing during the Second World War met a sufficiently high standard.

In 1988, NATA's role as an accreditation body was recognised by the Australian Government in a Memorandum of Understanding which was renewed in 2014.

Its head office is situated in Rhodes, New South Wales and it has offices in four other capital cities of Australia. It employs 180 staff and over three thousand volunteer technical experts who assist NATA in the assessment of facilities and on its various technical committees.

== Scope ==
NATA provides accreditation services to inspection bodies and producers of certified reference materials. It offers both "traditional" testing programs and "specialised" programs in areas such as medical and veterinary testing, forensic science, medical imaging, reference material production and proficiency testing.

NATA monitors members' compliance with the OECD Principles of Good Laboratory Practice (GLP).

NATA accreditation formally recognises facilities that meet the competency requirements to produce reliable technical results for a particular test method. Service providers are accredited to perform particular tests within their accreditation scope, and are permitted to endorse their test reports with NATA's logo when providing accredited services in compliance with NATA rules.

== International activities ==
NATA represents Australia in a number of high-level International fora related to laboratory, inspection body, reference material producer and proficiency testing service provider accreditation practices and policies.

NATA represents Australia through:

- the establishment of mutual recognition arrangements with other accreditation bodies
- holding Designating Authority status for laboratory and inspection body recognition from the Commonwealth Government
- the provision of input to a number of international committees, and to the development of the standards ISO/IEC 17025 (for testing and calibration laboratories), ISO 15189 (for medical laboratories) and ISO 17011 (for accreditation bodies).
