= ISO/IEC 19790 =

Standard for security requirements for cryptographic modules

ISO/IEC 19790 is an ISO/IEC standard for security requirements for cryptographic modules. It addresses a wide range of issues regarding their implementation, including specifications, interface definitions, authentication, operational and physical security, configuration management, testing, and life-cycle management. The first version of ISO/IEC 19790 was derived from the U.S. government computer security standard FIPS 140-2, Security Requirements for Cryptographic Modules.

As of March 2025, the current version of the standard is ISO/IEC 19790:2025 that replaced the previous versions, ISO/IEC 19790:2012 and ISO/IEC 19790:2006, which are now obsolete.

Use of ISO/IEC 19790 is referenced in the U.S. government standard FIPS 140-3. Unlike most ISO/IEC standards, access to it does not require payment, and it is available for free on the ISO website.

ISO/IEC 24759 is a related standard for the testing of cryptographic modules, the first version of which derived from NIST's Derived Test Requirements for FIPS PUB 140-2, Security Requirements for Cryptographic Modules.
