= World Standards Day =

International day on 14 October

World Standards Day (or International Standards Day) is an international day celebrated on 14 October each year. The day honours standards development organizations and aims to raise awareness among regulators, industry and consumers of the importance of standardization to the global economy.

== History ==
14 October was specifically chosen because delegates from 25 countries first gathered in London on that day in 1946 to create an international organization focused on facilitating standardization. ISO was formed one year later. The first World Standards Day was celebrated in 1970.

The day celebrates organizations such as the American Society of Mechanical Engineers (ASME), International Electrotechnical Commission (IEC), International Ethics Standards Board for Accountants (IESBA), International Organization for Standardization (ISO), International Telecommunication Union (ITU), Institute of Electrical and Electronics Engineers (IEEE) and Internet Engineering Task Force (IETF).

Though World Standards Day is officially 14 October, the date of observance varies by standards organization. The American National Standards Institute celebrated the day on 12 October in 2023 and 14 November in 2024. The World Trade Organization and the Standards Council of Canada observe it 14 October, as intended, though the Standards Council of Canada celebrated on 12 October in 2012.
