= Consumer Protection Association =

- စားသုံးသူကာကွယ်ရေးအသင်း
- Formation: 2012; 14 years ago
- Headquarters: Yangon, Myanmar
- Chairman: Ba Okkhaing

The Consumer Protection Association (CPA; Burmese: စားသုံးသူကာကွယ်ရေးအသင်း) is Myanmar's independent food consumer protection agency.
