= Commercial Internet Protocol Security Option =

Computer networking protocol for secret information

The Commercial Internet Protocol Security Option (CIPSO) is a mechanism for attaching security labels to Internet Protocol traffic. It was supported by an IETF working group in coordination with the Trusted Systems Interoperability Group. CIPSO was used by Solaris Trusted Extensions.

It has been replaced by the U.S. DoD Security Options for the Internet Protocol, defined in RFC 1108.

== See also ==
- IP Encapsulating Security Payload
