= Cryptographic Module Validation Program =

Joint American-Canadian security accreditation program for cryptographic modules

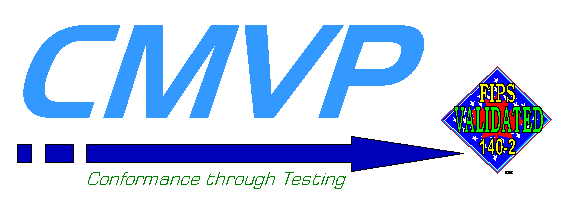
Logo

The Cryptographic Module Validation Program (CMVP) is a joint American and Canadian security accreditation program for cryptographic modules. The program is available to any vendors who seek to have their products certified for use by the U.S. Government and regulated industries (such as financial and health-care institutions) that collect, store, transfer, share and disseminate "sensitive, but not classified" information. All of the tests under the CMVP are handled by third-party laboratories that are accredited as Cryptographic Module Testing Laboratories by the National Voluntary Laboratory Accreditation Program (NVLAP). Product certifications under the CMVP are performed in accordance with the requirements of FIPS 140-3.

The CMVP was established by the U.S. National Institute of Standards and Technology (NIST) and the Communications Security Establishment (CSE) of the Government of Canada in July 1995.

The Cryptographic Algorithm Validation Program (CAVP), which provides guidelines for validation testing for FIPS approved and NIST recommended cryptographic algorithms and components of algorithms, is a prerequisite for CMVP.
