= Cryptographic module =

Cryptographic component of a computer system

A cryptographic module is a component of a computer system that securely implements cryptographic algorithms, typically with some element of tamper resistance.

NIST defines a cryptographic module as "The set of hardware, software, and/or firmware that implements security functions (including cryptographic algorithms), holds plaintext keys and uses them for performing cryptographic operations, and is contained within a cryptographic module boundary."

Hardware security modules, including secure cryptoprocessors, are one way of implementing cryptographic modules.

Standards for cryptographic modules include FIPS 140-3 and ISO/IEC 19790.

== See also ==
- Cryptographic Module Validation Program (CMVP)
- Cryptographic Module Testing Laboratory
