= Cost per activity =

When a mobile consumer requests content in the form of, for example, e-vouchers, audio files or video clips, the advertiser is charged a nominal sum by the platform that supports the marketing campaign. Each request is defined as an "activity". The platform's pricing charges a cost-per-activity. The amount payable by the advertiser is a function of the number of requests for content from the consumer, multiplied by the agreed cost/activity. This pricing model was created by Mobilitrix, a mobile services company based in Cape Town, South Africa. The advertiser only pays when a potential consumer accesses information or content as prompted by static media (POS poster, billboard, TV, radio or print advertisement). Alternatives include the pay per click, also known as the cost per click model.

== History ==
In February 2008, after three years of research and development, Mobilitrix launched its offering of a suite of interactive mobile marketing tools.

Mobilitrix Founder and CIO, Andrew Cardoza, an expert in satellite and cellular communication technology, with a NASA background, coined the term CPA during the run-up to the launch. The Mobilitrix site empowers marketers (from small to large firms) by giving them tools to cheaply create advertising and consumer interaction by providing downloadable content via SMS request, thereby extending the reach of traditional print and above-the-line media ad-spend.

Where classic print media revenue traditionally gets sold by size and the number of issues sold, Mobilitrix creates new revenue flows. E.g., a potential property buyer desiring further information on a house advertised in newsprint can request information by sending a keyword from a mobilitag icon on the featured ad via SMS, the individual receives additional information and images back their mobile phone.
