= ISO/IEC 17025 =

General requirements for the competence of testing and calibration laboratories

ISO/IEC 17025 General requirements for the competence of testing and calibration laboratories is the main standard used by testing and calibration laboratories. In most countries, ISO/IEC 17025 is the standard for which most labs must hold accreditation in order to be deemed technically competent. In many cases, suppliers and regulatory authorities will not accept test or calibration results from a lab that is not accredited. Originally known as ISO/IEC Guide 25, ISO/IEC 17025 was initially issued by ISO/IEC in 1999. There are many commonalities with the ISO 9000 standard, but ISO/IEC 17025 is more specific in requirements for competence and applies directly to those organizations that produce testing and calibration results and is based on more technical principles. Laboratories use ISO/IEC 17025 to implement a quality system aimed at improving their ability to consistently produce valid results. Material in the standard also forms the basis for accreditation from an accreditation body.

There have been three releases; in 1999, 2005 and 2017. The most significant changes between the 1999 and 2005 release were a greater emphasis on the responsibilities of senior management, explicit requirements for continual improvement of the management system itself, and communication with the customer. The 2005 release also aligned more closely with the 2000 version of ISO 9001 with regard to implementing continuous improvement.

The 2005 version of the standard comprises four elements:

1. Normative References
2. Terms and Definitions
3. Management Requirements - related to the operation and effectiveness of the quality management system within the laboratory
4. Technical Requirements - factors that determine the correctness and reliability of the tests and calibrations performed in the laboratory.

The 2017 version comprises eight elements:

1. Scope
2. Normative References
3. Terms and Definitions
4. General Requirements - related to the organization of the laboratory
5. Structural Requirements -related to the organization of the laboratory
6. Resource Requirements - cites issues related to the people, plant, and other organizations used by the laboratory to produce its technically valid results
7. Process Requirements - the heart of this version of the standard describes the activities to ensure that results are based on accepted science and aimed at technical validity.
8. Management System Requirements -steps taken by the organization to give itself quality management system tools to support the work of its people in the production of technically valid results

== Predecessors ==
Some national systems (e.g. UKAS M10 in the UK) were the forerunners of ISO/IEC 17025:1999 but could also be exceedingly prescriptive. ISO/IEC 17025 allows laboratories to carry out procedures in their own ways, but require the laboratory to justify using a particular method.

In common with other ISO quality standards, ISO/IEC 17025 requires continual improvement. Additionally, the laboratory will be expected to keep abreast of scientific and technological advances in relevant areas.

In common with other accreditation standards of the ISO 17000 series (and unlike most ISO standards for management systems), assessment of the laboratory is normally carried out by the national organization responsible for accreditation. Laboratories are therefore "accredited" under ISO/IEC 17025, rather than "certified" or "registered" by a third party service as is the case with ISO 9000 quality standard.

In short, accreditation differs from certification by adding the concept of a third party (Accreditation Body (AB)) attesting to technical competence within a laboratory in addition to its adherence and operation under a documented quality system, specific to a Scope of Accreditation.

== Accreditation bodies ==
In order for accreditation bodies to recognize each other's accreditations, the International Laboratory Accreditation Cooperation (ILAC) worked to establish methods of evaluating accreditation bodies against another ISO/CASCO standard (ISO/IEC Guide 58 - which became ISO/IEC 17011). Around the world, regions such as the European Community, the Asia-Pacific, the Americas and others, established regional cooperations to manage the work needed for such mutual recognition. These regional bodies (all working within the ILAC umbrella) include European Accreditation Cooperation (EA), the Asia Pacific Laboratory Accreditation Cooperation (APLAC), Southern African Development Community Cooperation in Accreditation (SADCA) and the Inter-American Accreditation Cooperation (IAAC).

The first laboratory accreditation bodies to be established were National Association of Testing Authorities (NATA) in Australia (1947) and TeLaRC in New Zealand (1973). Most other bodies are based on the NATA/TELARC model include UKAS in the UK, FINAS in Finland and DANAK in Denmark to name a few.

=== USA ===
In the U.S. there are several, multidisciplinary accreditation bodies that serve the laboratory community. These bodies accredit testing and calibration labs, reference material producers, PT providers, product certifiers, inspection bodies, forensic institutions and others to a multitude of standards and programs. These ILAC MRA signatory accreditation bodies carry identical acceptance across the globe. It does not matter which AB is utilized for accreditation. The MRA arrangement was designed with equal weight across all economies. ABs include:

- The ANSI-ASQ National Accreditation Board (ANAB)|ANSI-ASQ National Accreditation Board
- The American Association for Laboratory Accreditation (A2LA)
- Perry Johnson Laboratory Accreditation (PJLA)
- American Industrial Hygiene Association
- International Accreditation Service, Inc. (IAS)
- National Voluntary Laboratory Accreditation Program (NVLAP) - technically part of the US government and only accredits a few narrow disciplines
- American Society of Crime Laboratory Directors-Laboratory Accreditation Board (ASCLD-LAB) which is now ANAB (see above).

=== Canada ===
In Canada, there are two accreditation bodies:

- Standards Council of Canada
- The Canadian Association for Laboratory Accreditation

The accreditation of calibration laboratories is the shared responsibility of the Standards Council of Canada (SCC) Program for the Accreditation of Laboratories-Canada (PALCAN), and the National Research Council of Canada (NRC) Calibration Laboratory Assessment Service (CLAS). The CLAS program provides quality system and technical assessment services and certification of specific measurement capabilities of calibration laboratories in support of the Canadian National Measurement System.

=== Other countries ===
In other countries there is often only one Accreditation Body. Typically these bodies encompass accreditation programs for management systems, product certification, laboratory, inspection, personnel and others:

- National Association of Testing Authorities (NATA) (Australia)
- Comité français d'accréditation (COFRAC) (France)
- DAkkS (Germany)
- National Accreditation Board for Testing and Calibration Laboratories (NABL) (India)
- Komite Akreditasi Nasional (KAN) (Indonesia)
- Irish National Accreditation Board (INAB) (Ireland)
- Accredia - The Italian Accreditation Body (Italy)
- Dutch Accreditation Council (RVA) (The Netherlands)
- International Accreditation New Zealand (IANZ) (New Zealand)
- Korea Laboratory Accreditation Scheme (KOLAS) (South Korea)
- Bureau of Accreditation (BoA) (Vietnam)
- BiH Institute for Accreditation (BATA) (Bosnia & Hercegovina)
- Spanish Association for Standardization and Certification (AENOR) (Spain)
- Belac (Belgium)
- Turkish Accreditation Agency (TURKAK) (Turkey)

== See also ==
- List of ISO standards
- ISO 17025 Documents
- Quality management system
- Measurement uncertainty
