= Rainbow Series =

Series of computer security standards

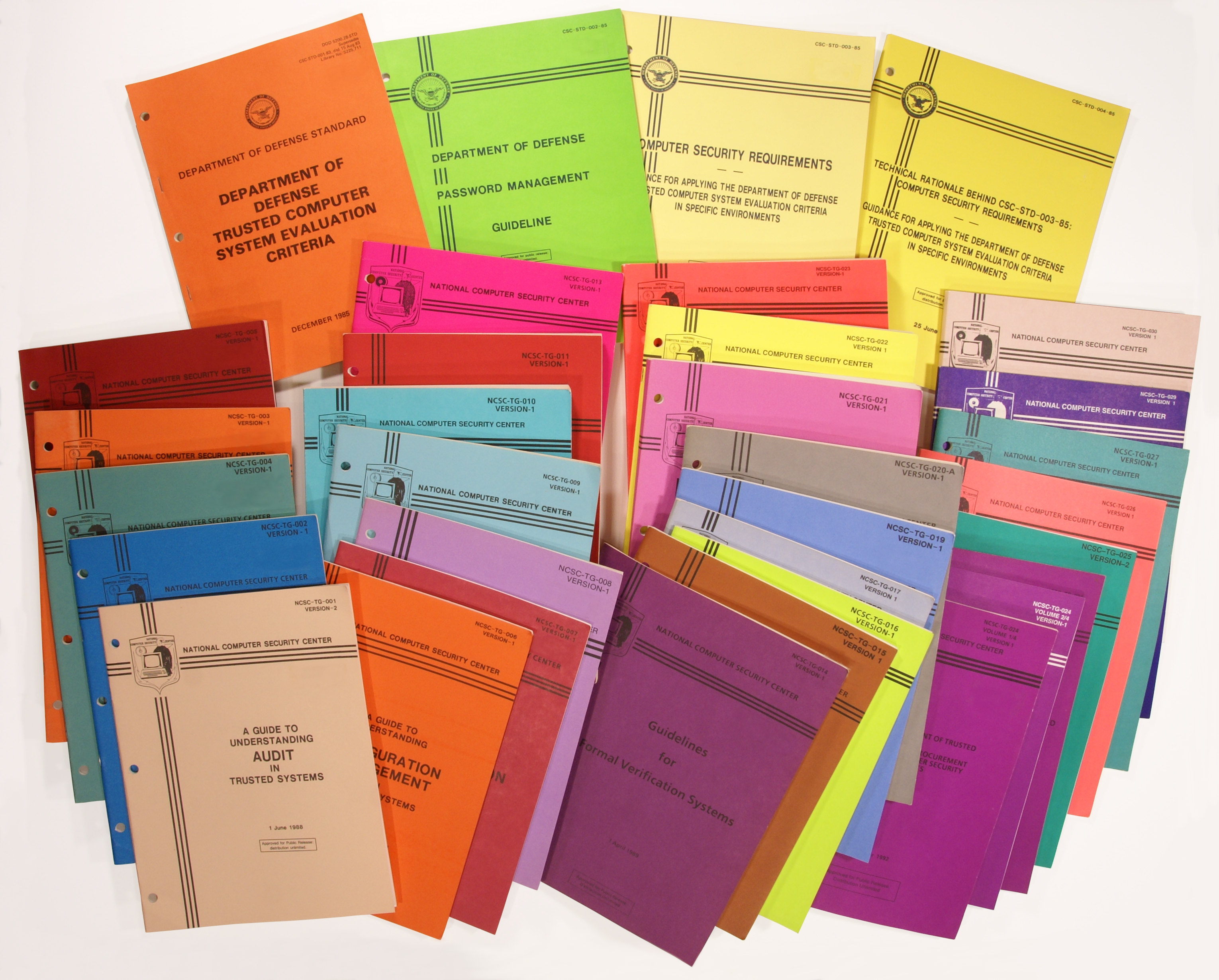
A complete set of the US DoD Rainbow Series computer security documents

The Rainbow Series (sometimes known as the Rainbow Books) is a series of computer security standards and guidelines published by the United States government in the 1980s and 1990s. They were originally published by the U.S. Department of Defense Computer Security Center, and then by the National Computer Security Center.

== Objective ==
These standards describe a process of evaluation for trusted systems. In some cases, U.S. government entities (as well as private firms) would require formal validation of computer technology using this process as part of their procurement criteria. Many of these standards have influenced, and have been superseded by, the Common Criteria.

The books have nicknames based on the color of its cover. For example, the Trusted Computer System Evaluation Criteria was referred to as "The Orange Book." In the book entitled Applied Cryptography, security expert Bruce Schneier states of NCSC-TG-021 that he "can't even begin to describe the color of [the] cover" and that some of the books in this series have "hideously colored covers." He then goes on to describe how to receive a copy of them, saying "Don't tell them I sent you."

== Most significant Rainbow Series books ==
NIST Rainbow Series
Document	Title	Date	Color
5200.28-STD	DoD Trusted Computer System Evaluation Criteria	August 15, 1983	Orange
CSC-STD-002-85	DoD Password Management Guideline	April 12, 1985	Green
CSC-STD-003-85	Guidance for Applying TCSEC in Specific Environments	June 25, 1985	Light Yellow
CSC-STD-004-85	Technical Rationale Behind CSC-STD-003-85: Computer Security Requirements	June 25, 1985	Yellow
NCSC-TG-001	A Guide to Understanding Audit in Trusted Systems	June 1, 1988	Tan
NCSC-TG-002	Trusted Product Security Evaluation Program	June 22, 1990	Bright Blue
NCSC-TG-003	Discretionary Access Control in Trusted Systems	September 30, 1987	Neon Orange
NCSC-TG-004	Glossary of Computer Security Terms	October 21, 1988	Teal Green
NCSC-TG-005	Trusted Network Interpretation	July 31, 1987	Red
NCSC-TG-006	Configuration Management in Trusted Systems	March 28, 1988	Amber
NCSC-TG-007	A Guide to Understanding Design Documentation in Trusted Systems	October 6, 1988	Burgundy
NCSC-TG-008	A Guide to Understanding Trusted Distribution in Trusted Systems	December 15, 1988	Dark Lavender
NCSC-TG-009	Computer Security Subsystem Interpretation of the TCSEC	September 16, 1988	Venice Blue
NCSC-TG-010	A Guide to Understanding Security Modeling in Trusted Systems	October 1992	Aqua
NCSC-TG-011	Trusted Network Interpretation Environments Guideline (TNI)	August 1, 1990	Red
NCSC-TG-012	Trusted Database Management System Interpretation	April 1991	
NCSC-TG-013	RAMP Program Document	1989	Pink
NCSC-TG-013 V2	RAMP Program Document version 2	March 1, 1995	Pink
NCSC-TG-014	Guidelines for Formal Verification Systems	April 1, 1989	Purple
NCSC-TG-015	Guide to Understanding Trusted Facility Management	October 18, 1989	Brown
NCSC-TG-016	Guidelines for Writing Trusted Facility Manuals	October 1992	Yellow-Green
NCSC-TG-017	Identification and Authentication in Trusted Systems	September 1991	Light Blue
NCSC-TG-018	Object Reuse in Trusted Systems	July 1992	Light Blue
NCSC-TG-019	Trusted Product Evaluation Questionnaire	May 2, 1992	Blue
NCSC-TG-020	Trusted UNIX Working Group (TRUSIX) Rationale for Selecting Access Control List Features for the UNIX System	July 7, 1989	Silver
NCSC-TG-020-A	Trusted UNIX Working Group (TRUSIX) Rationale for Selecting Access Control List Features for the UNIX (R) System	August 18, 1989	Grey Silver
NCSC-TG-021	Trusted Database Management System Interpretation of the TCSEC (TDI)	April 1991	Purple
NCSC-TG-022	Trusted Recovery in Trusted Systems	December 30, 1991	Yellow
NCSC-TG-023	Security Testing and Test Documentation in Trusted Systems	July 1993	Bright Orange
NCSC-TG-024 Vol. 1/4	Procurement of Trusted Systems: An Introduction to Procurement Initiators on Computer Security Requirements	December 1992	Purple
NCSC-TG-024 Vol. 2/4	Procurement of Trusted Systems: Language for RFP Specifications and Statements of Work	June 30, 1993	Purple
NCSC-TG-024 Vol. 3/4	Procurement of Trusted Systems: Computer Security Contract Data Requirements List and Data Item Description	February 28, 1994	Purple
NCSC-TG-024 Vol. 4/4	Procurement of Trusted Systems: How to Evaluate a Bidder's Proposal Document	Publication TBA	Purple
NCSC-TG-025	Guide to Understanding Data Remanence in Automated Information Systems.	September 1991	Forest Green
NCSC-TG-026	Writing the Security Features User's Guide for Trusted Systems	September 1991	Hot Peach
NCSC-TG-027	Information System Security Officer Responsibilities for Automated Information Systems	May 1992	Turquoise
NCSC-TG-028	Assessing Controlled Access Protection	May 25, 1992	Violet
NCSC-TG-029	Certification and Accreditation Concepts	January 1994	Blue
NCSC-TG-030	Covert Channel Analysis of Trusted Systems	November 1993	Light Pink
