= Standards Council of Canada =

National standards body

- Standards Council of Canada
- Abbreviation: CCN/SCC
- Formation: October 7, 1970
- Type: Crown corporation
- Headquarters: Ottawa, Ontario, Canada
- Official languages: English; French
- Chief Executive Officer: Chantal Guay
- Website: scc.ca

The Standards Council of Canada (SCC) (French: Conseil canadien des normes (CCN)) is a Canadian crown corporation with the mandate to promote voluntary standardization in Canada. The SCC is responsible for:

- Accreditation of standards development and conformity assessment organizations;
- Approval of standards submitted as National Standards of Canada (NSC);
- Adoption of relevant policies to support SCC programs and services; and
- Approval of budgets and audited financial statements.

The SCC has a governing council that oversees the organization and an executive staff that is responsible for the operation of the organization. The organization reports to Parliament of Canada through the Minister of Innovation, Science and Economic Development. It receives some funding from the federal government as well as revenue from accreditation services and donations from individuals and organizations in support of international standardization work.

The SCC represents Canada in the International Organization for Standardization (ISO) and International Electrotechnical Commission (IEC).

== Oversight ==
The SCC coordinates the Canadian national standardization network, which includes organizations and individuals involved in voluntary standards development, promotion, and implementation.

=== Standards development ===
The SCC develops and implements the National Standards Strategy, a national plan for the development of voluntary technical standards in support of national social and business goals.

More than 12,500 Canadian volunteer members contribute to committees that develop international standards. Many of these volunteers also serve in national standards development activities through SDOs accredited by SCC.

=== Accreditation ===
The SCC has accredited more than 400 organizations, overseeing the accreditation of SDOs and global certification bodies. These activities have increased competition in the certification market, and have contributed to reducing the time-to-market for businesses whose products require certification.

== Governance ==
The SCC's governing Council, appointed by the federal government, is responsible for overseeing the organization's strategic direction, ensuring the fulfillment of its mandate, and providing guidance on governance matters. The council also works closely with SCC management developing policy items as well as providing advice on the organization's strategic direction.

== History ==
In 1964, the federal government conducted a comprehensive review of standards activity in Canada. The study identified several deficiencies in the country's approach to standardization, including coordination and long-term planning, support from industry and government, and Canadian involvement in international standardization.

=== Act ===
In 1970, the government responded by passing the Standards Council of Canada Act, establishing the Standards Council of Canada.

Under the Act, the Council's mandate is "to promote efficient and effective voluntary standardization in Canada, where standardization is not expressly provided for by law and:"

- promote the participation of Canadians in voluntary standards activities,
- promote public-private sector cooperation in relation to voluntary standardization in Canada,
- coordinate and oversee the efforts of the persons and organizations involved in the National Standards System,
- foster quality, performance and technological innovation in Canadian goods and services through standards-related activities, and
- develop standards-related strategies and long-term objectives

Source: Standards Council of Canada Act

One of its powers is "represent Canada as the Canadian member of the International Organization for Standardization, the International Electrotechnical Commission and any other similar international organization". Within two years, the SCC held a seat on the International Organization for Standardization’s governing council.

== Accreditation Services Branch ==
The SCC's Accreditation Services branch accredits conformity assessment bodies, such as testing laboratories and product certification bodies, to internationally recognized standards. Conformity assessment is the practice of determining whether a product, service or system meets the requirements of a particular standard.

The organization operates accreditation and recognition programs for the following:

- Calibration and testing laboratories
- Good laboratory practice
- Greenhouse gas validators and verifiers
- Inspection bodies
- Management systems certification bodies
- Medical laboratories
- Personnel certification bodies
- Product and service certification bodies
- Proficiency testing providers
- Standards developing organizations (SDO)

The SCC is also a member of many organizations, such as the International Accreditation Forum (IAF) and the International Laboratory Accreditation Cooperation (ILAC), that have mutual recognition agreements in place to assist with international acceptance of conformity assessment results. These agreements are part of greater efforts to form a global accreditation system.

== Strategy and Stakeholder Engagements Branch (SSEB) ==
The Strategy and Stakeholder Engagements Branch (SSEB) conducts outreach and engagement with stakeholders with the greatest potential influence and impact on standardization in Canada. Through its analysis of trends and conditions of significance to standardization-related work, the SSEB can identify and define the necessary conditions for Canada to optimize its use of standardization, facilitate the development of roadmaps in support of targeted economic areas, and make recommendations that influence standards and conformity assessment related aspects of trade and regulatory policy.

== Standards and International Relations Branch (SIRB) ==
Standards are developed through consensus by committees of affected stakeholders that may include representatives from industry, government, academia, and the public interest. An organization that specializes in the development of standards established and oversees these committees. Most standards are voluntary; there are no laws requiring their application.

However, an increasingly competitive marketplace for goods and services means that more and more customers are demanding adherence to specific standards. Governments also make some standards mandatory by referencing them in legislation or regulations. The SCC accredits organizations that develop standards in Canada. Accreditation is the verification that an organization has the competence necessary to carry out a specific function.

The SCC's accreditation programs are based on internationally recognized guidelines and standards. The SCC accredits Canadian standards development organizations and also approves Canadian standards as National Standards of Canada, based on a specific set of requirements.

The Role of SIRB

The SCC does not develop standards itself. It plays the role of coordinating standards work in Canada and ensuring Canada's input on standards issues within international standards organizations.

The SCC's Standards branch is organized into three sections: Canadian Standards Development, International Standards Development, and Global Standards Governance. The branch carries out a variety of functions intended to ensure the effective and coordinated operation of standardization in Canada.

The branch also represents Canada's interests in standards-related matters in foreign and international forums. SIRB manages Canadian participation in the standards development initiatives of the International Organization for Standardization (ISO) and the International Electrotechnical Commission (IEC), as well as participation in regional standards organizations.

== See also ==
- World Standards Day
- Standards Board of England
- Standards New Zealand
- American National Standards Institute
