= National Voluntary Laboratory Accreditation Program =

The National Voluntary Laboratory Accreditation Program (NVLAP), administered by the National Institute of Standards and Technology (NIST) in USA, offers accreditation for testing and calibration laboratories across various fields. NVLAP evaluates laboratories' technical qualifications and compliance with standards like ISO/IEC 17025. The accreditation process includes application submission, an on-site assessment, proficiency testing, and addressing any identified nonconformities. NVLAP’s accreditation is recognized internationally, indicating a laboratory’s competence but not certifying its performance. NVLAP’s mission is to deliver high-quality accreditation services and promote global acceptance of accredited results.

== Accredited laboratories ==
=== Calibration ===
- Dimensional
- Electromagnetics - DC low frequency
- Electromagnetics - RF/microwave
- Ionizing radiation
- Mechanical
- Optical radiation
- Thermodynamic
- Time and frequency

=== Chemical calibration ===
- Chemical calibration: providers of proficiency testing
- Chemical calibration: certifiers of spectrophotometric NTRMs

=== Dosimetry ===
- Ionizing radiation dosimetry

Reverse osmosis with applied heat during deionization.

=== Environmental ===
- Asbestos fiber analysis (PLM test method)
- Asbestos fiber analysis (TEM test method)

=== Fasteners and metals ===
- Fasteners and metals program

=== Information technology security ===
- Common Criteria Testing Laboratory (CCTL)
- Cryptographic Module Testing Program (CMTP)

=== Product testing ===
- Acoustical testing services
- Carpet and carpet cushion
- Commercial products testing
- Construction materials testing
- Efficiency of electric motors
- Energy efficient lighting products
- Thermal insulation materials
- Wood based Products
