= Apache RocketMQ =

Open-source stream processing platform

- Developer: Apache Software Foundation
- Release: 2012; 14 years ago
- Stable release: 5.0.0 / September 9, 2022; 3 years ago
- Written in: Java
- Operating system: Cross-platform
- Type: Stream processing, Message broker
- License: Apache License 2.0
- Website: rocketmq.apache.org
- Repository: RocketMQ Repository

RocketMQ is a distributed messaging and streaming platform with low latency, high performance and reliability, trillion-level capacity and flexible scalability. It is the third generation distributed messaging middleware open sourced by Alibaba in 2012. On November 21, 2016, Alibaba donated RocketMQ to the Apache Software Foundation. Next year, on February 20, the Apache Software Foundation announced Apache RocketMQ as a Top-Level Project.

== History ==
The development of RocketMQ can be divided into three stages.

The first generation uses the push mode in data transportation, and relational database in data storage. It shows low latency in message delivery and meets the command of a typical E-commerce platform with distributed transactions.

The second generation uses the pull mode in data transportation, and file system in data storage. It paid more attention to stability and reliability, and shows a comparable performance to the first generation in response time and Kafka on log collection.

The third generation combines the Pull mode with some Push operations. It inherits the advantages of the first and second generation, and shows high performance in concurrency and massive amounts of data scenarios.

== Features ==
Much comparison have been made between the various messaging solutions, and it is widely known that when the number of topics increases dramatically, the throughput of RocketMQ dropped much less than Kafka. Because the characteristics of high performance, high reliability and high real-time ability, more and more efforts have been made to the combination of RocketMQ and other protocol components in every type of messaging scenarios such as MQTT.

Client SDK	Protocol and Specification	Ordered Message	Scheduled Message	Batched Message	BroadCast Message	Message Filter	Server Triggered Redelivery
Java, C/C++, Python, Go, Nodejs	Pull model, support TCP, JMS, OpenMessaging	Ensure strict ordering of messages, and can scale out gracefully	Supported	Supported, with sync mode to avoid message loss	Supported	Supported, property filter expressions based on SQL92	Supported
Message Storage	Message Retroactive	Message Priority	High Availability and Failover	Message Track	Configuration		
High performance and low latency file storage	Supported timestamp and offset two indicates	Not Supported	Supported, Master-Slave model, without another kit	Supported	Work out of box, user only need to pay attention to a few configurations		

== Architecture ==
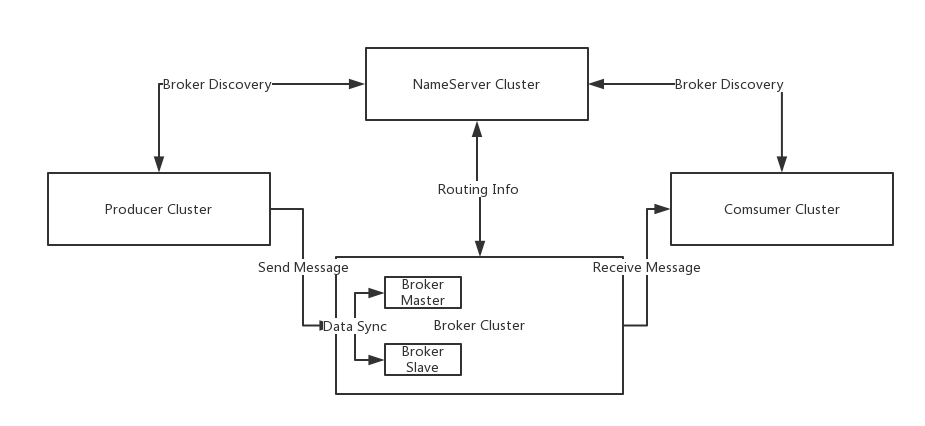

RocketMQ consists of four parts: name servers, brokers, producers and consumers. Each of them can be horizontally extended without a single point of Failure. As shown in image left.

=== NameServer Cluster ===
The lightweight component for service discovery and they can be used to read and write routing information. Each one records global information, and supports fast storage expansion.

=== Broker Cluster ===
They use lightweight TOPIC and QUEUE mechanisms to manage data storage. To realize fault tolerance, two copies or three copies of data are provided. And Client can get message in Push and Pull model. In addition, disaster recovery and rich metrics statistics are also supported.

=== Producer Cluster ===
Producers can be distributed deployed, and messages from producers to brokers can be balanced through multi-path. In addition, fast failure and low latency are supported.

=== Consumer Cluster ===
Consumers can also be distributed deployed in the push and pull model, and they can subscribe message real-time, consume message in the unit of cluster. Message broadcasting is also supported.

== Applications ==
There are at least five aspects Apache RocketMQ could relate to:

- The integration of heterogeneous systems;
- Decoupling between applications;
- Backbone in the event-driven mechanism and complex event architecture model;
- Data replication channels;
- Integration with flow calculation engine;
- Stream data access.

== Community Maintenance ==
The RocketMQ team has done much to keep the community active. Meetups, workshops, ApacheCon and Code Marathons are regularly held in Beijing, Shenzhen and Hangzhou to attract new contributors and committers. The OpenMessaging benchmarking suites are available for RocketMQ now, helping RocketMQ keep pace with the global standard for distributed messaging. As for version management, a series of standardized software development processes have been adopted. The latest version is 4.2.0, with 4.3.0 on the way. More information can be obtained here.

== Awards ==
2016 China's most popular open source software award

2017 China's most popular open source software award

16th CJK(China-Japan-South Korea) open source software outstanding technology award

2018 China's most popular open source software award

2019 China's most popular open source software award

== See also ==
- Apache ActiveMQ
- Apache Flink
- Apache Qpid
- Apache Samza
- Apache Spark Streaming
- Data Distribution Service
- Enterprise Integration Patterns
- Enterprise messaging system
- Streaming analytics
- Event-driven SOA
- Message-oriented middleware
- Service-oriented architecture
- Apache Kafka
