= JBoss (disambiguation) =

JBoss may refer to:

- JBoss (company), a software development company
- JBoss Application Server (JBoss AS), a Java EE-based application server, now known as WildFly
- JBoss Enterprise Application Platform (JBoss EAP)

== See also ==
- List of JBoss software
