= JBoss Messaging =

- Developer(s): JBoss
- Final release: 1.4.5 / September 30, 2009
- Repository: anonsvn.jboss.org/repos/messaging/
- Written in: Java
- Operating system: Cross-platform
- Type: asynchronous messaging system
- License: LGPL
- Website: https://jbossmessaging.jboss.org/

JBoss Messaging is the JBoss enterprise asynchronous messaging system. It supersedes JBoss MQ as the default Java Message Service (JMS) provider in JBoss Application Server (JBoss AS) 5. JBoss Messaging has been superseded by HornetQ, which, in turn, has been superseded by Apache ActiveMQ Artemis.

JBoss Messaging 1.0 was released on 29 March 2006 as a re-engineered version of JBoss MQ intended to deliver a modular messaging engine capable of shipping with or without JBoss.

JBoss Messaging is the default JMS provider in JBoss Enterprise Application Platform 4.3, JBoss SOA Platform and JBoss Application Server 5.

JBoss Messaging is an open source project available under the Gnu LGPL licence and is led by Tim Fox with core engineers Andy Taylor, Clebert Suconic, Howard Gao and Jeff Mesnil.

On 24 August 2009, HornetQ was launched, based on the JBoss Messaging 2.0 code-base, and the JBoss Messaging project was put into bug fix mode only by JBoss.

== See also ==
- List of JBoss software
- Message passing
