= JBoss Enterprise SOA Platform =

Open-source software

- Developer: Red Hat
- Stable release: 5.3.1 / Feb 20 2013
- Written in: Java
- Operating system: Cross-platform
- Type: Service-oriented architecture (SOA), Enterprise service bus (ESB)
- License: GNU Lesser General Public License
- Website: http://www.jboss.com/products/platforms/soa/

The JBoss Enterprise SOA Platform (or JBoss SOA Platform) is free software/open-source Java EE-based service-oriented architecture (SOA) software. The JBoss Enterprise SOA Platform is part of the JBoss Enterprise Middleware portfolio of software. The JBoss Enterprise SOA Platform enables enterprises to integrate services, handle business events, and automate business processes, linking IT resources, data, services and applications. Because it is Java-based, the JBoss application server operates cross-platform: usable on any operating system that supports Java. The JBoss SOA Platform was developed by JBoss, now a division of Red Hat.

== Product features and components ==
- Business rules engine
- JBoss jBPM
- JBoss Enterprise Service Bus (JBossESB)
- Event management and complex event processing (CEP)
- Event-driven architecture (EDA)
- Data integration
- Service-oriented architecture (SOA) services
- HornetQ
- JBoss Enterprise Application Platform (JBoss EAP)
- Java Enterprise Edition (JEE) services
- Computer clustering
- Java Connector Architecture (JCA)

== Enterprise Data Services Platform (EDSP) ==
The JBoss Enterprise Data Services Platform (JBoss EDSP) is data virtualization software, a superset of the JBoss Enterprise SOA Platform. The JBoss EDSP uses the enterprise service bus (ESB) software JBoss Enterprise Service Bus (JBossESB). The JBoss EDSP includes:

- tools for creating data views that are accessible through standard protocols
- a repository for storing metadata
- a runtime environment for data integrity and security

== Licensing and pricing ==
JBoss itself is open source, but Red Hat charges to provide a support subscription for JBoss Enterprise Middleware.

== See also ==
- List of JBoss software
- Comparison of business integration software

== Bibliography ==
- Marrs, Tom; Davis, Scott (July 1, 2009). JBoss At Work: A Practical Guide. O'Reilly. p. 306. ISBN 978-0-596-00734-8.
- Stark, Scott; Fleury, Marc; Richards, Norman (April 30, 2005). JBoss 4.0 The Official Guide. Sams. p. 648. ISBN 978-0-672-32648-6.
