= List of JBoss software =

This is a list of articles for JBoss software, and projects from the JBoss Community and Red Hat. This open-source software written in Java is developed in projects, and productized with commercial-level support by Red Hat.

== JBoss productized software ==
JBoss Enterprise Middleware (software productized by Red Hat)	Type	Description
JBoss A-MQ	Platform	A small-footprint, high-performance, open source message-oriented middleware platform that can be deployed at outlets and devices for integration that extends beyond the data center.
JBoss Enterprise Application Platform (JBoss EAP)	Platform	A Java EE-based application server runtime platform used for building, deploying, and hosting highly transactional Java applications and services
JBoss Enterprise Web Platform (JBoss EWP)	Platform	A Java EE-based application server runtime platform for building, deploying, and hosting applications and services; a lighter weight version of the JBoss EAP
JBoss Enterprise Web Server (JBoss EWS)	Platform	A large scale web server with a platform for lightweight Java applications based on Apache Tomcat and Apache Web Server
JBoss Enterprise BRMS	Platform	A business rule management system (BRMS) and reasoning engine for business policy and rules development, access, and change management; a productized version of JBoss Drools and OptaPlanner
JBoss Rules	Platform	Java software for a reasoning engine based on JBoss Drools; the flagship product is JBoss Enterprise BRMS
JBoss Enterprise Portal Platform (JBoss EPP)	Platform	An enterprise portal with the core web portal features of presentation, master page objects, containers, and a repository, and also an optional site publisher
JBoss Enterprise SOA Platform (JBoss SOA-P)	Platform	A Java EE-based Service Oriented Architecture (SOA) software product; includes the business integration and enterprise service bus (ESB) software JBoss Enterprise Service Bus (JBossESB or JBoss ESB)
JBoss Data Virtualization	Platform	This is the Data virtualization solution based on Teiid project.
JBoss Fuse	Platform	A small-footprint, flexible, open source enterprise service bus (ESB) that can be deployed for integration that extends beyond the data center. Fabric8 is a free Apache 2.0 Licensed upstream community for the JBoss Fuse product from Red Hat.
JBoss Hibernate	Framework	An Object-Relational Mapping (ORM) library that provides a framework for mapping an object-oriented domain model to a relational database for the purpose of persistent storage, and additional related software that enables the use of POJO-style domain models
JBoss Seam	Framework	A web application framework development platform for building rich Internet applications
JBoss Web Framework Kit	Framework	A set of web frameworks for building light and rich Java applications, including the rich Internet application frameworks Google Web Toolkit (GWT) and RichFaces, and the Java frameworks Spring and Apache Struts
JBoss Developer Studio (JBDS)	Tools and testing	An integrated development environment (IDE) to develop, test, and deploy rich web applications, transactional enterprise applications, and SOA services, including JBoss Enterprise Application Platform, JBoss Enterprise SOA Platform, JBoss Data Virtualization, JBoss Enterprise BRMS, and JBoss Enterprise Portal Platform; technologies available include Hibernate, WildFly for Java EE 5 and 6, Drools, jBPM, RichFaces, Seam, etc.
JBoss Operations Network (JBoss ON or JON)	Management	A systems management suite for the JBoss Middleware products that provides monitoring, alerting, remote operational control, and remote configuration for network management

== JBoss projects and software ==
JBoss project or software	Type	Description
GateIn	Web interface	A project that merged JBoss Portal and eXo Portal to produce GateIn Portal; used in JBoss Enterprise Portal Platform (JBoss EPP) Subprojects: GateIn Portal – both an enterprise portal and also a web portal framework to build upon; a merge of JBoss Portal 2.7 and eXo Portal 2.5 that produced GateIn Portal 3.0; GateIn Portlet Container – an implementation of the JSR 286 Java Portlet Specification 2.0; eXo JCR – an implementation of the JSR 170 Java Content Repository (JCR) API; JBoss Portlet Bridge – an implementation of the JSR 301 and JSR 329 specifications; for description, see JBoss Portlet Bridge in this table
JBoss Portlet Bridge	Web interface	A non-final draft implementation of the JSR 301 and JSR 329 specifications that supports JavaServer Faces (JSF) within a JSR 286 portlet, and also supports other web frameworks such as Seam and RichFaces; used in JBoss Enterprise Portal Platform
RichFaces	Web interface	A project that produces a user interface component framework for integrating Ajax capabilities into applications using JavaServer Faces (JSF); a Java software component library for the development of web-based user interfaces
Switchyard	Programming model	To support SOA and ESB programming models in Java, a lightweight service delivery framework to define the contract, policies, configuration, composition, and management of services, with the goal of making the runtime managed automatically Components: SwitchYard Core – provides the base capabilities required to define, register, and communicate with services; SwitchYard Components – plug-ins to provide functionality such as connectivity, routing, translation, and orchestration; SwitchYard Test – supports repeatable, self-contained tests during development; SwitchYard Tools – a command-line and graphical toolset that supports the development, deployment, and management of the services
ESB (JBossESB or JBoss ESB)	Programming model	JBoss Enterprise Service Bus (ESB) is an implementation of Enterprise Application Integration (EAI), enterprise service bus (ESB) software, and business integration software; JBossESB part of a Service-Oriented Infrastructure (SOI) and a Service-Oriented Architecture (SOA)
Weld	Programming model	The reference implementation of JSR 299 Java Contexts and Dependency Injection (CDI) for the Java EE platform
Seam	Programming model	A web application framework development platform for building rich Internet applications Technologies include: Asynchronous JavaScript and XML (AJAX); JavaServer Faces (JSF); Java Persistence (JPA); Enterprise Java Beans (EJB); Business Process Management (BPM); Associated tools
OSGi	Programming model	A framework that implements the OSGi specification for a module system and service platform that provides a dynamic component model for WildFly (JBoss AS)
EJB3	Programming model	Enterprise Java Beans is a managed, server-side component architecture for modular construction of enterprise applications
Snowdrop	Programming model	JBoss-specific extensions to the Spring Framework to support the Spring Deployer, for situations when the Spring Framework generic implementation does not integrate correctly with WildFly, and for access directly to the underlying JBoss Microcontainer
RESTEasy	Programming model	A project that implements the JAX-RS specification by providing various frameworks for building RESTful web services and RESTful Java applications; a Java API for RESTful web services over the HTTP protocol that implements JAX-RS
TorqueBox	Programming model	A Ruby application platform, built on WildFly, including Ruby on Rails and support for services such as messaging, scheduling, and daemons
Errai	Programming model	A framework for building rich web applications using the Google Web Toolkit (GWT) Includes: ErraiBus message bus for message exchange between client and server components; ErraiWorkspaces to provide a UI environment in which to deploy a console and tooling similar to an Eclipse workspace; Contexts and Dependency Injection (CDI) integration; Java Message Service (JMS) integration; Portals integration; Tools to create, diagnose and monitor applications
Railo	Programming model	An engine for the ColdFusion Markup Language (CFML) that compiles code written in CFML into Java bytecode and executes it on a servlet engine for the purpose of building web applications
KIE - Knowledge Is Everything	Services	The process of researching an integration knowledge solution for Drools and jBPM has simply used the "droolsjbpm" group name. This name permeates GitHub accounts and Maven POMs. As scopes broadened and new projects were spun KIE, an acronym for Knowledge Is Everything, was chosen as the new group name. The KIE name is also used for the shared aspects of the system; such as the unified build, deploy and utilization.
Drools	Services	A Business Rule Management System (BRMS) and reasoning engine used in JBoss Rules and JBoss Enterprise BRMS; a Business Logic integration platform for Rules, Workflow and Event Processing Subprojects: Drools Guvnor (Business Rules Manager); Drools Expert (rule engine); jBPM 5 (process/workflow engine); Drools Fusion (event processing/temporal reasoning); Drools Planner (automated planning)
Hibernate	Services	A project that includes an object-relational mapping (ORM) library that provides a framework for mapping an object-oriented domain model to a relational database for the purpose of persistent storage, and additional related subprojects that enable the use of POJO-style domain models Key features: Mapping from Java classes to database tables; Mapping from Java data types to SQL data types; Data query and retrieval facilities; Additional features provide support for tools, annotations, auditing/versioning, horizontal partitioning, JSR 303 Bean Validation, mapping for Apache Lucene, and mapping for the .NET Framework
HornetQ	Services	A project that produces a Message Oriented Middleware (MoM) messaging system that is multi-protocol, embeddable, clustered, and asynchronous; JBoss Messaging moved to this project
jBPM	Services	A Business Process Management (BPM) suite, including a workflow engine, designed for the needs of business analysts, software developers, and end users
RiftSaw	Services	A WS-BPEL 2.0 engine, optimized for WildFly (JBoss AS) container, and based on Apache ODE, JBossWS, and JBossESB
JGroups	Services	A toolkit for reliable multicast communication
Transactions (JBossTS)	Services	The JBoss Transaction Service (JBossTS) is a Java Transaction API (JTA) that allows distributed transactions across multiple resources, and protects against data corruption by guaranteeing complete, accurate transactions, including web services through support of the specifications WS-Coordination, WS-AtomicTransaction, and WS-BusinessActivity; Narayana is JBossTS 5
Blacktie	Services	Tools to support XATMI in Java EE, including API bindings in both C/C++ and Java for clients and services, and an XATMI broker for standalone Java applications, for XATMI clients, and to call XATMI services
Web Services (JBossWS)	Services	JBoss Web Services (JBossWS) provides support for Java EE web services with a JAX-WS implementation
Remoting	Services	A Java framework for symmetric and asymmetric communication over a network, including invocations, one way messaging, and asynchronous callbacks
PicketBox	Services	A Java security framework for authentication, authorization, auditing, and security mapping, and also an OASIS XACML v2.0 compliant engine
PicketLink	Services	A project that addresses various identity management needs in Java It is being merged into the Keycloak project. Components: IDM – an object model for managing identities (Users/Groups/Roles) and associated behavior; Federated Identity – support for SAML v2, WS-Trust, and OpenID; AuthZ – an authorization framework for developers; XACML – support for OASIS XACML v2; Negotiation – support for SPNego/Kerberos based desktop Single sign-on (SSO)
IronJacamar	Services	A Java Connector Architecture (JCA) container inside WildFly that allows access to an Enterprise Information System (EIS) using a standard resource adapter (a protocol adapter) provided by the EIS vendor
Clustering	Services	Clustering for scalability and High Availability (HA) of WildFly, including fail-over, load-balancing, and distributed deployment
Keycloak	Services	Integrated SSO and IDM for browser apps and RESTful web services. Built on top of the OAuth 2.0, Open ID Connect, JSON Web Token (JWT) and SAML 2.0 specifications
Marshalling	Services	A serialization and marshalling API that is an enhanced alternative to the standard java.io.Serializable and its relatives found in the Java Development Kit (JDK)
Serialization	Services	A serialization API that is a faster alternative to the standard java.io.ObjectInputStream and java.io.ObjectOutputStream found in the Java Development Kit (JDK); includes smart cloning, the capability of the reuse of final fields among different class loaders
Tohu	Services	A UI generation tool used to support the building of question and answer style interactions from Drools rulesets
WildFly	Servers	WildFly (formerly named JBoss Application Server or JBoss AS) is a Java EE application server platform for developing and deploying enterprise Java applications, web applications, and web portals
Web	Servers	A web server that is based on Tomcat, is designed for medium and large applications, and includes Java Server Pages (JSP), Java Servlet technologies, PHP, and CGI
Teiid	Servers	Data virtualization software used to access heterogeneous and distributed data stores with a uniform API Components: Query engine – the core of Teiid that processes relational, XML, XQuery, and procedural queries from federated datasources; Server – the runtime framework that runs inside WildFly (JBoss AS); Connectors – translators and resource adapters for access to sources that include most relational databases, web services, text files, and LDAP; Tools: Teiid Designer – for description, see Teiid Designer in this table; Teiid JOPR Console – to monitor, manage, and control servers; Teiid AdminShell – uses scripting to support the automation of administrative and testing tasks
Mobicents	Servers	A project that produces an open-source VoIP platform Subprojects: Mobicents JAIN SLEE; Mobicents Sip Servlets; Mobicents Media Server; Mobicents SIP Presence Service; Mobicents Diameter; Mobicents SS7
Microcontainer	Servers	Direct POJO deployment and standalone use outside WildFly with all the features of the JMX Microkernel and direct IOC style dependency injection
Jopr and RHQ	Management	Relationship between Jopr and RHQ: Jopr was previously a project for the management of WildFly, but is now part of the RHQ project; RHQ is a systems management suite for multiple products and platforms that provides monitoring, alerting, remote operational control, and remote configuration
Embedded Jopr	Management	A web-based application for managing and monitoring WildFly
ModeShape	Management	A JSR 283 Java Content Repository (JCR) 2.0 implementation that provides access to existing information, including files, systems, databases, other repositories, services, applications, etc. (formerly named JBoss DNA)
Overlord	Management	An umbrella project for the management and governance of the JBoss SOA Platform, dealing with the processes by which a system operates, providing for the management, monitoring and administration of those processes, and the discipline of creating policies and communicating and enforcing the policies Subprojects: Guvnor – for description, see Guvnor in this table; ModeShape – for description, see ModeShape in this table; SAVARA – for description, see SAVARA in this table; SAMM – the Service Activity Monitoring and Management (SAMM) project uses complex event processing (CEP) technology to analyze events from distributed systems and present the information in a concise form
Guvnor	Management	Governance Repository utilities and tools for governing and managing artifacts, including rule and process definitions, service descriptions, database schemas, etc.
StormGrind	Cloud	The umbrella project for the JBoss cloud software Subprojects: CirrAS – front-end, back-end, and management appliances built using BoxGrinder for cloud deployment using WildFly; SteamCannon – a cloud-aware platform as a service (PaaS) environment that acts as a broker for PaaS resources (e.g., Amazon EC2); StormFolio – a set of GateIn and Fedora images for Amazon EC2; each image is an Amazon Machine Image (AMI); Cantiere – a set of Rake tasks to build RPM files
BoxGrinder	Cloud	A set of projects for building appliances for virtualization and Cloud providers: BoxGrinder Studio – a Web front-end for BoxGrinder REST (in planning); BoxGrinder REST – a RESTful API to BoxGrinder Build; BoxGrinder Build – a command line tool to build appliances
Tools	Tools, testing	An umbrella project for Eclipse plugins and features for Java software development for JBoss Developer Studio, J2EE, and related technology, including Hibernate, WildFly, Drools, jBPM, JavaServer Faces, (X)HTML, Seam, Smooks, JBoss ESB, JBoss Portal, etc.
Teiid Designer	Tools, testing	A visual tool for model-driven definition (including virtual databases containing views, procedures, or dynamic XML documents), integration, management and testing of data services, without programming, using the Teiid runtime framework
Arquillian	Tools, testing	A test framework that can be used to perform testing inside a remote or embedded container, or deploy an archive to a container so the test can interact as a remote client; Arquillian integrates with other testing frameworks (e.g., JUnit 4, or TestNG 5), allowing the use of IDE, Ant, and Maven test plugins
ShrinkWrap	Tools, testing	An API to assemble archives (e.g., JAR, WAR, or EAR), which can then be deployed into an integration container (e.g., JBoss EmbeddedAS, GlassFish v3 Embedded, Jetty, or OpenEJB), or exported to a file, or exported to an exploded directory structure, or serialized over a network to a remote host, etc.; ShrinkWrap is the supported deployment mechanism of the Arquillian project
JSFUnit	Tools, testing	A test framework for JavaServer Faces (JSF) applications, with JSFUnit tests running inside a container, which allows access to managed beans, the FacesContext, EL Expressions, the internal JSF components, and the parsed HTML output
Tattletale	Tools, testing	A tool that produces reports from the JAR files of a Java project or product which can be used to locate components and identify issues regarding dependencies, versions, black listed APIs, OSGi, etc.
Byteman	Tools, testing	A tool to trace and test Java programs Features: Insert extra Java code into an application or Java library, either as it is loaded during JVM startup or while it is running; Does not require use or preparation of the source code; For testing, inject faults or synchronization code to perform unusual or unexpected operations; Uses a scripting language based on Event Condition Action (ECA) rules that specify: a trigger point – where the code should be inserted; the trigger condition – a boolean expression that is evaluated when execution arrives at the trigger point; the trigger action – a sequence of expression(s) to be executed if the boolean expression is true
Scribble	Tools, testing	A language used to describe the application-level protocols used by systems to communicate, that can be used for the behavioral assurance of programs during development and validation The language has three layers: the bottom layer is a type layer describing the session type; the second layer is an assertion layer used to further describe the type layer; the third layer is a protocol document layer used to describe multiple protocols and their constraints
SAVARA	Tools, testing	A project that provides a methodology and tools for testing so that any artifacts defined during a phase of the software lifecycle can be validated against other artifacts in preceding and subsequent phases of the lifecycle, providing assurance that the final delivered system meets the original business requirements
Profiler	Tools, testing	A profiler using JVMPI and JVMTI that uses an agent written in C that logs to disk events from the JVM; the logs are accessed and analyzed using a web browser
Mass	Tools, testing	A project that facilitates migration to JBoss Enterprise Platforms and JBoss Enterprise Frameworks Subprojects: Migration Analysis Tool (MAT) – a tool used to estimate the effort required to migrate J2EE applications from an Oracle/BEA WebLogic environment to a WildFly / JBoss Enterprise Application Platform environment
Distributed Test Framework (JBossDTF)	Tools, testing	Testing tool: runs tests involving multiple processes, including clients and servers, in heterogeneous environments
PressGang	Other	The focus of documentation assistance for JBoss projects, including the JBoss Documentation Guide, jDocBook Styles, help with using DocBook XML, and access to subject matter experts
mod_cluster	Other	A httpd-based load balancer that forwards requests to one of a set of server nodes, and using Mod-Cluster Management Protocol (MCMP), receives server-side load balance factors and lifecycle events from the server nodes
Netty	Other	A project that produces an asynchronous event-driven network application framework and tools for the development of network protocol servers and clients; a client–server framework for the development of Java applications using network programming
XNIO	Other	A low-level I/O API, an improvement on New I/O (NIO), that includes blocking and non-blocking operations, multicast sockets, support for channels (e.g., SSL or virtual channels), and a callback-based interface
Javassist	Other	A load-time reflective programming system that is a class library for editing bytecode to define a new class at runtime and to modify a class file before the JVM loads it
Wise	Other	A project that produces a Java framework to invoke web services as an alternative to JAX-WS, usable as a base for zero-code web service invocation Components include: Wise-core – a library for web service invocation; Wise-webgui – a web application used to call a generic web-service given the WSDL; Logging Meta Service (LMS) – a tool used to log TCP communications to view request-response messages
Maven jDocBook Plugin	Other	A tool to render DocBook content as part of a Maven build using as dependencies the DocBook distribution, custom XSLT, custom fonts, custom images, and custom css
Maven jDocBook Style Plugin	Other	No information available
Maven jBoss-retro Plugin	Other	A tool to use JBoss Retro as part of a Maven build
Maven Buildmagic Thirdparty Plugin	Other	A tool to integrate projects using Ant/Buildmagic and projects using Maven
Buildmagic	Other	A collection of Ant tasks used to build multi-module Ant projects
APIviz	Other	A JavaDoc doclet which extends the Java standard doclet to generate UML-like class and package diagrams for understanding the overall API structure
Retro	Other	A tool for transforming compiled bytecode from one format to another, including renaming classes, redirecting method calls, changing data types, and translating JDK 1.5 bytecode to JDK 1.4 bytecode
Forums	Other	A Forums portlet based on JavaServer Faces (JSF), designed for use with JBoss Portal 2.X
Wiki	Other	A Wiki portlet based on the JSPWiki wikitext syntax, designed for use with JBoss Portal 2.7
Blog	Other	A web application to manage multiple feeds and aggregate information into a web interface
Portal	Archive	A project that was made part of the GateIn Portal project
Portlet Container	Archive	A project that was made part of the GateIn Portal project
Messaging	Archive	An enterprise asynchronous messaging system that superseded JBoss MQ as the default Java Message Service (JMS) provider in WildFly (JBoss AS) 5; this messaging project was moved to the HornetQ project
Cache (JBC)	Archive	JBoss Cache (JBC) implements a cache, that can be replicated and transactional, for frequently accessed Java objects to improve application performance
AOP	Archive	A framework for Aspect-Oriented Programming (AOP)
IIOP	Archive	Supports CORBA/IIOP access to enterprise beans deployed in WildFly (JBoss AS).
JMX	Archive	The project JBossMX produces an implementation of Java Management Extensions, and is the core of the JBoss microkernel architecture for WildFly
JRunit	Archive	A project that adds benchmarking and distributed client/server based tests to JUnit
Gravel	Archive	A set of component libraries that provide components for JavaServer Faces (JSF) applications
Kosmos	Archive	A suite of portlets to monitor software development projects
Shotoku	Archive	Access to repositories that support revisioning, including JSR 170 Java Content Repository (JCR), Subversion, and file-system based repositories
DavCache	Archive	A filesystem-style interface to JBoss Cache that can be accessed by a WebDAV-capable client, including Windows Explorer
Reporting Services	Archive	A project that produces reporting services for enterprise applications
Portlet Swap	Archive	A place to exchange JSR 168 portlets and themes and layouts for use in JBoss Portal
Metajizer	Archive	A metadata maintenance tool for the browser Firefox bookmark links
JBoss Mail Server (JBoss Collaboration Server)	Archive	Messaging and collaboration software; this project moved to Buni.org in late 2006, and is renamed Meldware Communication Suite

== See also ==
- Comparison of application servers
- Comparison of business integration software
- Comparison of integrated development environments
- Comparison of network monitoring systems
- Comparison of object-relational mapping software
- Comparison of web server software
