= Message queuing service =

Type of message-oriented middleware

A message queueing service is a message-oriented middleware or MOM deployed in a compute cloud using software as a service model. Service subscribers access queues and or topics to exchange data using point-to-point or publish and subscribe patterns.

== Goals ==
A message queueing service aims to eliminate the traditional overhead associated with operating in-house messaging infrastructures. These operating overheads include:

- Unused capacity installed to meet peak demands
- Human resources that are necessary to maintain messaging infrastructure
- Projects idle time waiting for resource provisioning
- Need to isolate messaging resources

Besides reducing cost, a message queueing service seeks to simplify access to messaging resources and therefore facilitate integration efforts within organizations and between them.

== Benefits ==
A message queueing service also creates new value by providing reduced costs, enhanced performance and reliability. In order to provide those benefits, a message queueing service leverages cloud computing resources such as storage, network, memory and processing capacity. By using virtually unlimited cloud computing resources, a message queueing service provides an internet scale messaging platform.

== Accessibility ==
A message queueing service is accessible through a variety of protocols such as Java Message Service, AMQP, REST-style APIs and web services.

== Usage Examples ==
- Patient gets admitted into a hospital out of his provider's network. Producer hospital can start sending real time events about the treatment of the patient to his physician's hospital using a message queueing service platform. The cost of integration between hospitals is marginal since they do not need to configure messaging protocols, VPNs and other details.
- Information processing organization that processes events from thousands of different sources, can ask its information providers to simply place messages onto queue services and reduce integration costs.
- A Call Centre can carry on servicing requests for bills to be present when the billing system is unavailable
- Embedded telemetry devices in vehicles can securely communicate with an application that number crunches statistics in near-real time; Round-robin messaging lets the vehicle supplier add computing resources as his sales increase.
- Security trading application can post updates to P&L application that might be unavailable at the moment.
- Technician submits an x-ray while consuming application instances in London, Chicago and São Paulo compete who gets the message first by listening on the same queue.

== Vendors ==
Apache Kafka
Apache Kafka is a distributed system consisting of servers that store and forward messages between producer client and consumer applications.
IBM MQ

IBM MQ offers a managed service that can be used on IBM Cloud and Amazon Web Services.

Microsoft Azure Service Bus
Service Bus offers queues, topics & subscriptions, and rules/actions in order to support publish-subscribe, temporal decoupling, and load balancing scenarios. Azure Service Bus is built on AMQP allowing any existing AMQP 1.0 client stack to interact with Service Bus directly or via existing .Net, Java, Node, and Python clients. Standard and Premium tiers allow for pay as you go or isolated resources at massive scale.
Oracle Messaging Cloud Service
This service provides a messaging solution for applications for asynchronous communication and is influenced by the Java Message Service (JMS) API specification. Any application platform that understands HTTP can also use Oracle Messaging Cloud Service through the REST interface. For Java applications, Oracle Messaging Cloud Service provides a Java library that implements and extends the JMS 1.1 interface. The Java library implements the JMS API by acting as a client of the REST API.
Amazon Simple Queue Service
Supports messages natively up to 256K, or up to 2GB by transmitting payload via S3. Highly scalable, durable and resilient. Provides loose-FIFO and 'at least once' delivery in order to provide massive scale. Supports REST API and optional Java Message Service client. Low latency. Utilizes Amazon Web Services.
IronMQ
Supports messages up to 64k; guarantees order; guarantees once only delivery; no delays retrieving messages. Supports REST API and beanstalkd open source protocol. Runs on multiple clouds including AWS and Rackspace. Scaling must be managed by user.
StormMQ
Open platform supports messages up to 50Mb. Uses AMQP to avoid vendor lock-in and provide language neutrality. Locate-It Option allows customers to audit the location of their data at all times and satisfy data protection principles.
AnypointMQ
An enterprise multi-tenant, cloud messaging service that performs advanced asynchronous messaging scenarios between applications. Anypoint MQ is fully integrated with Anypoint Platform, offering role based access control, client application management, and connectors.

== See also ==
- Message broker
- Message queue
- Notification service
