= Open Message Queue =

Message-oriented middleware project

- Original author(s): Sun Microsystems
- Developer(s): Eclipse Foundation
- Stable release: 6.6.0 / May 29, 2025
- Repository: github.com/eclipse-ee4j/openmq
- Written in: Java
- Operating system: Cross-platform
- Type: Java Message Service Message-oriented middleware Enterprise messaging system SOA
- License: Eclipse Public License 2.0, GPL linking exception
- Website: https://projects.eclipse.org/projects/ee4j.openmq

Open Message Queue (OpenMQ or Open MQ) is an open-source message-oriented middleware project by Eclipse Foundation that implements the Java Message Service 3.1 API (JMS). It is the default JMS provider integrated into GlassFish.

In addition to support for the JMS API, OpenMQ provides additional enterprise features including clustering for scalability and high availability, a C API, and a full JMX administration API. It also includes an implementation of the Jakarta Connectors called the JMSRA, that allows OpenMQ to be used by a Jakarta EE compliant application server.

== See also ==
- Message-oriented middleware
