= OpenWire (binary protocol) =

OpenWire is a binary protocol designed for working with message-oriented middleware. It is the native wire format of ActiveMQ Classic.
