= OpenDDS =

OpenDDS may refer to:

- ICL VME
- OpenDDS, an open-source implementation of Data Distribution Service
