= InRule Technology =

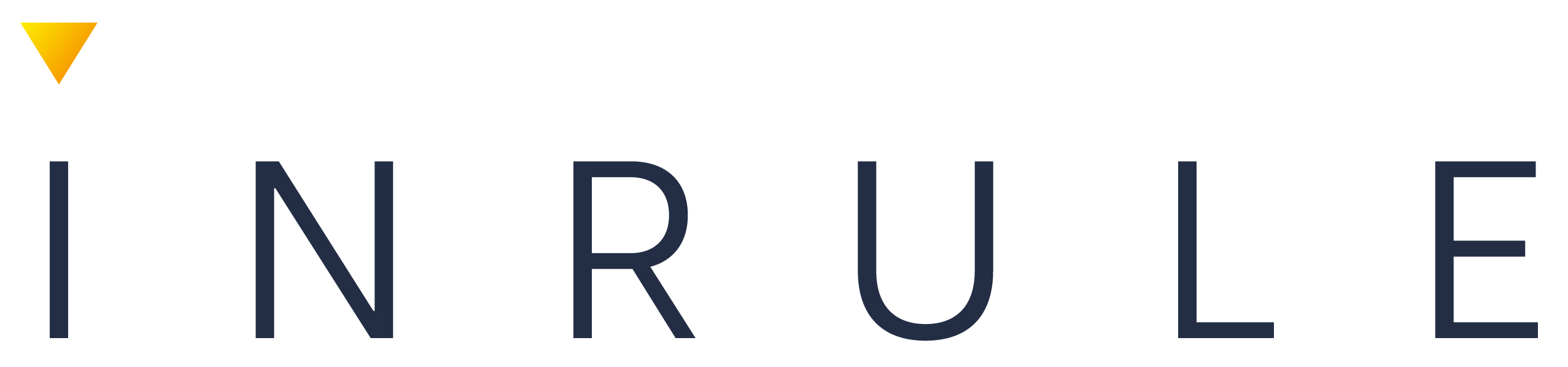
- InRule Technology
- Company type: Privately held company
- Industry: Software
- Founded: 2002; 23 years ago in Chicago, United States
- Founder: Rik Chomko, Loren Goodman
- Headquarters: Chicago, Illinois, United States
- Products: InRule; InRule for JavaScript; InRule for Microsoft Azure; InRule for Microsoft Dynamics 365; InRule for the Salesforce Platform; InRule SaaS
- Website: www.inrule.com

InRule Technology is a software company that offers Business Rule Management System (BRMS) enterprise software products.

== History ==
InRule Technology's Chief Executive Officer Rik Chomko and Chief Technology Officer Loren Goodman founded InRule Technology in Chicago in 2002. Paul Hessinger joined InRule Technology in 2004 as chief executive officer and chairman of the board and served until his retirement in 2015. They work with companies in several markets, including financial services, public sector, healthcare, and insurance.

In 2007, InRule Technology became a charter member of the Microsoft Business Process Alliance.

In August 2019, InRule was acquired by Open Gate Capital.

== Products ==
On October 29, 2012, InRule Technology launched InRule for Microsoft Dynamics CRM. The program provides components to enable creation and update of rules within Microsoft Dynamics CRM, InRule for Microsoft Dynamics CRM provides a platform for shops that prefer to work with Microsoft's platforms.

With the availability of InRule 4.6 in 2014, the company introduced deployment of InRule through REST services and allowed REST services to be called from InRule. This enables access to data exposed as a REST service and to package up a rule service for RESTful access. The product launch reflected the move of the company's core audience to use a broader array of technologies despite an earlier focus on .NET.

In 2017, InRule introduced InRule for the Salesforce Platform, as well as a technology partnership with Work-Relay, a Business Process Management (BPM) application built on the Salesforce Platform. One year earlier the company introduced InRule for JavaScript, allowing enterprises to run rules on the client-side, server-side or both.

The software architecture includes multiple components, including irAuthor, the primary authoring tool for creating and maintaining rules; irVerify, a real-time test environment to run and debug rule applications; and irSDK, a set of APIs that allows developers to integrate inRule into their applications. Additionally, irSOA allows users to access the InRule rule engine as a service. irSOA is now called the irServer Execution Service.

== See also ==
- FICO
- IBM/ILOG
- Drools
- Pegasystems
- Oracle Corporation
