= Apache Qpid =

Open-source messaging system

- Developer: Apache Software Foundation
- Written in: C++, Java, Ruby, Perl, Python, C#
- Operating system: Cross-platform
- Type: AMQP, Java Message Service, Message-oriented middleware, Enterprise Messaging System
- License: Apache License 2.0
- Website: qpid.apache.org
- Repository: git-wip-us.apache.org/repos/asf/qpid-cpp.git

Apache Qpid is an open-source messaging system which implements the Advanced Message Queuing Protocol (AMQP). It provides transaction management, queuing, distribution, security, management, clustering, federation and heterogeneous multi-platform support. The Apache Qpid API supports multiple programming languages and comes with both C++ (for Perl, Python, Ruby, .NET etc.) and Java (JMS API) brokers.

== History ==
In 2005 JPMorgan Chase approached other firms to form a working group that included Cisco Systems, IONA Technologies, iMatix, Red Hat, and Transaction Workflow Innovation Standards Team (TWIST). In the same year JPMorgan Chase partnered with Red Hat to create Apache Qpid, initially in Java and soon after C++.

== List of components ==
Apache Qpid consists of a set of messaging APIs, servers and tools.

Qpid components
Component	Type	Version	Released
Qpid Proton	Messaging API	0.40.0	November 20, 2024
Qpid Proton-J	Messaging API	0.35.0	July 31, 2026
Qpid JMS (AMQP 1.0)	Messaging API	0.57.0	March 15, 2021
Qpid JMS AMQP 0-x	Messaging API	6.4.0	May 28, 2020
Qpid Messaging API C++	Messaging API	1.39.0	October 21, 2018
Qpid Messaging API Python	Messaging API	1.37.0	November 22, 2017
Broker-J	Messaging server	8.0.4; 7.1.12	February 15, 2021
C++ Broker	Messaging server	1.39.0	October 21, 2018
Dispatch router	Messaging server	1.15.0	February 8, 2021
Qpid Interop Test	Messaging tools	0.2.0	September 7, 2018

== See also ==
- Message-oriented middleware
- Enterprise Messaging System
- Enterprise Integration Patterns
- Service-oriented architecture
- Event-driven SOA
