= JBoss Tools =

Software plugins for Eclipse

- Developers: JBoss, a division of Red Hat
- Release: December 10, 2007; 18 years ago
- Stable release: 4.29.1.Final / June 13, 2024; 2 years ago
- Written in: Java
- Operating system: Cross-platform
- Type: Software development
- License: Predominantly EPL and LGPL
- Website: http://tools.jboss.org/

JBoss Tools is a set of Eclipse plugins and features designed to help JBoss and JavaEE developers develop applications. It is an umbrella project for the JBoss developed plugins that will make it into JBoss Developer Studio.

== Modules ==
JBoss Tools includes the following modules:

- Visual Page Editor (VPE). The visual editor contributed by Exadel supports visual editing of HTML and JSF (JSP and Facelets) pages. VPE also includes visual support for JSF component libraries including JBoss RichFaces.
- Seam Tools. Includes support for (for example) seam-gen, RichFaces VE integration, Seam related code completion and refactoring.
- Hibernate Tools. Supporting mapping files, annotations and JPA with reverse engineering, code completion, project wizards, refactoring, interactive HQL/JPA-QL/Criteria execution and more. In short a merger of Hibernate Tools and Exadel ORM features.
- JBoss AS Tools. Easy start, stop and debug of JBoss AS 4+ servers from within Eclipse. Also includes features for packaging and deployment of any type of Eclipse project.
- Drools IDE. Rules file editing, Rete View, working memory debugging/inspection and more.
- jBPM Tools. jBPM workflow editing, deployment, etc.
- JBossWS Tools. Inspecting, invoking, developing and functional/load/compliance testing of web services over HTTP, base tooling provided by soapUI with the addition of JBossWS specific features/support.
- JBoss ESB Tools. The structured XML editor for the jboss-esb.xml file used in JBoss ESB.
- Birt Tools. Hibernate and Seam extensions for Eclipse BIRT.
- Portal Tools. JBoss Tools supports the JSR-168 Portlet Specification (Portlet 1.0), JSR-286 Portlet Specification (Portlet 2.0) and works with PortletBridge for supporting Portlets in JSF/Seam applications. To enable these features, add the JBoss Portlet facet to a new or an existing web project.
- Core/General Tools. To reduce the UI clutter, most of the "configure project" menu items move into the Configure menu introduced in Eclipse 3.5 instead of always having a static JBoss Tools menu entry show up even in projects unrelated to JBoss Tools.
- Smooks Tools. The editor for Smooks configuration files.
- JBoss ESB Tools. The ESB project Wizard, which creates a project that can be deployed as an .esb archive to a JBoss AS-based server with JBoss ESB installed.
- JMX Tools. JMX Tools allows establishing multiple JMX connections and provides views for exploring the JMX tree and execute operations directly from Eclipse. The JMX Tools replaces the JMX node previously available in the JBoss Server View.
- JST/JSF Tools. RichFaces Support, Code Assists, Web XML/JSP/XHTML editors, CSS style editing, web.xml validation, Faceleted taglib in *taglib.xml is supported with XSD schema location.
- Project Examples. The experimental feature called Project Example wizard aims to allow users to download example projects from a remote site and have them working out-of-the-box.
- AS/Project Archives Tools. To deploy projects compressed, configurable in the server editor. If enabled, all projects deployed to that server will be compressed instead of in an exploded folder.
- Maven Tools. The optional integration with m2eclipse to provide Maven support for projects created by JBoss Tools and to some extent core WTP projects.
- BPEL Tools. A BPEL Editor based on the Eclipse BPEL project has been added to JBoss Tools. This means that users can create, edit and deploy BPEL artifacts for the Riftsaw BPEL Runtime.
- CDI (JSR-299) Tools. Support of the Contexts and Dependency Injection annotations; it works on any Eclipse Java project (via the Configure menu with CDI enabled).

== See also ==
- List of JBoss software
- Comparison of integrated development environments
