= AeroGear =

AeroGear is an open-source coding platform developed by Red Hat for cross-platform enterprise mobile app development.

== History ==
AeroGear was established in 2012 as a project under the JBoss umbrella. Its first release, AeroGear 1.0.0.M6 for iOS, launched in November 2012 and focused on providing foundational tools for data synchronization and security.

AeroGear UnifiedPush Server 1.1.0 was released on November 5, 2015, introducing enhanced capabilities for managing mobile push notifications.

On July 4, 2018, AeroGear Mobile Services 1.0.0 was launched, aiming to enhance mobile development services. AeroGear Mobile Services version 2.0.0 followed, releasing on March 22, 2019.

== Coding principles and objectives ==
AeroGear supports mobile developers working with traditional Java EE backends through libraries for iOS, Android, and JavaScript. It also includes an open platform where developers can be assigned projects based on their preferences.

AeroGear is built on a Unified Application Programming Interface (API), providing a pipeline for languages and platforms such as Android, iOS, and JavaScript.

In 2018, AeroGear shifted its focus to providing services on OpenShift such as push notifications and authentication.
