= Ajax4jsf =

Web framework implementing JSF with Ajax capabilities

- Original author(s): Alexander Smirnov, Exadel, JBoss
- Stable release: now part of RichFaces
- Type: Ajax, Java, JSF, Framework
- Website: www.jboss.org/jbossajax4jsf/

Ajax4jsf was a project for an open source framework that added Ajax capabilities to the JavaServer Faces (JSF) web application framework.

It was an early entrant to the JSF space, but did implement a still-rare feature, that of skinning.

Ajax4jsf is now contained entirely within the RichFaces project.

== History ==
Ajax4jsf was created by Alexander Smirnov in early 2005. New technologies of the time were Ajax and JavaServer Faces. Smirnov figured to merge the two, so that it would then be easy to have Ajax functionality within a JSF application.

The project began on SourceForge.net under the name Telamon (from the Shakespeare play, Antony and Cleopatra).

Later that same year, Smirnov joined Exadel and continued to develop the framework. The first version was released in March 2006, as part of Exadel Visual Component Platform or Exadel VCP. Later in 2006 it was split into the Ajax4jsf framework and RichFaces. While RichFaces provided a "component-centric" Ajax approach (components do everything you need), Ajax4jsf provided what's called "page-oriented" Ajax support. The developer specifies what parts of the page should be processed on the server after some client-side user actions, and what client-side parts should be updated afterwards. Ajax4jsf became an open source project hosted on Java.net, while RichFaces became a commercial JSF component library.

In March 2007, JBoss and Exadel agreed a partnership where Ajax4jsf and RichFaces would now be under the JBoss umbrella and be called JBoss Ajax4jsf and JBoss RichFaces. RichFaces would now also be open sourced and free. In September 2007, JBoss and Exadel decided to merge Ajax4jsf and RichFaces under the RichFaces name. This made sense as both libraries now had the same free, open source licence. Having just one product also simplified versioning and compatibility issues.

Although now part of JBoss RichFaces, the code still contains references to the identifier 'a4j' .
