= OpenWire =

OpenWire may refer to:

- OpenWire (library), a dataflow library
- OpenWire (binary protocol), a binary protocol designed for working with message-oriented middleware
