= JBoss operations network =

Open-source network management software

JBoss Operations Network
- Developer(s): Red Hat
- Stable release: 3.3.11 / June 17, 2019; 5 years ago
- Written in: Java
- Operating system: Cross-platform
- Type: Network management
- License: GNU Lesser General Public License
- Website: http://www.jboss.com/products/jbosson/

JBoss Operations Network (or JBoss ON or JON) is free software/open-source Java EE-based network management software. JBoss Operations Network is part of the JBoss Enterprise Middleware portfolio of software. JBoss ON is an administration and management platform for the development, testing, deployment, and monitoring of the application lifecycle. Because it is Java-based, the JBoss application server operates cross-platform: usable on any operating system that supports Java. JBoss ON was developed by JBoss, now a division of Red Hat.

== Product features ==
JBoss ON provides performance, configuration, and inventory management in order to deploy, manage, and monitor the JBoss middleware portfolio, applications, and services.

JBoss ON provides management of the following:

- Discovery and inventory
- Configuration management
- Application deployment
- Perform and schedule actions on servers, applications and services
- Availability management
- Performance management
- Provisioning (IT)

JBoss ON is the downstream of RHQ (see also section Associated Acronyms).

== Licensing & Pricing ==
The various JBoss application platforms are open source, but Red Hat charges to provide a support subscription for JBoss Enterprise Middleware.

== Associated acronyms ==
Acronyms associated with JBoss ON:

- RHQ - upstream open source project of JBoss ON. Current stable version is RHQ 4.13; main difference between RHQ 4 and RHQ 3 is the transition of the UI framework to Google Web Toolkit.
- Jopr - previously the JBossAS management bits (upstream) of JBoss ON - now integrated into the RHQ source base (since September 2009). Jopr used to use RHQ as its upstream. There will be no more separate Jopr releases.
- JON - JBoss Operations Network (ON)

== See also ==
- List of JBoss software
- Network monitoring system
- Comparison of network monitoring systems
- HyPerformix IPS Performance Optimizer
- IBM Tivoli Framework

== Bibliography ==
- Marrs, Tom; Davis, Scott (July 1, 2009). JBoss At Work: A Practical Guide. O'Reilly. p. 306. ISBN 978-0-596-00734-8.
- Stark, Scott; Fleury, Marc; Richards, Norman (April 30, 2005). JBoss 4.0 The Official Guide. Sams. p. 648. ISBN 978-0-672-32648-6.
