= Marc Fleury =

French-American programmer

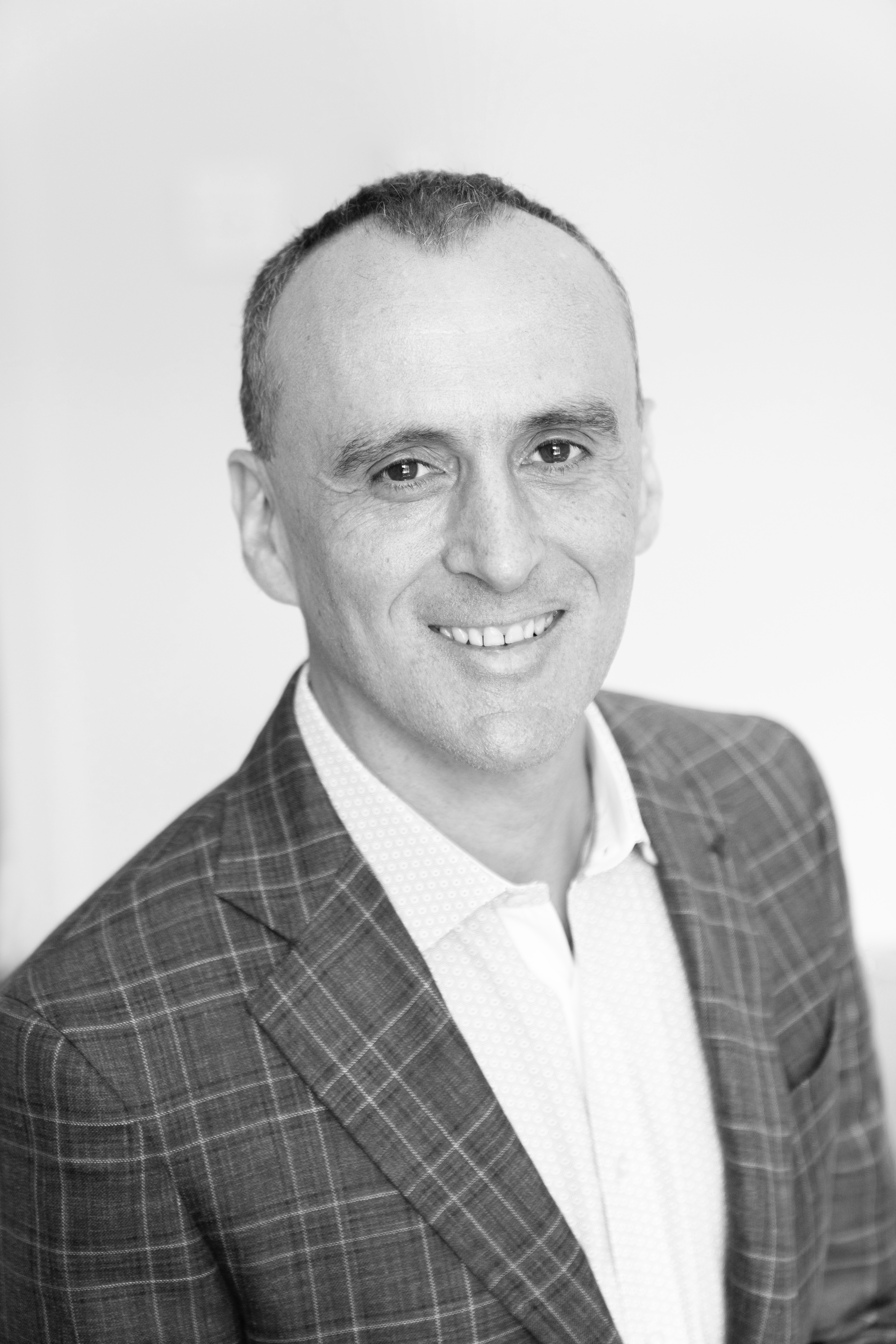
- Born: 1968 (age 57–58); Paris
- Education: Physics
- Known for: JBoss

Marc Fleury is a Franco-American computer scientist, physicist, musician and businessperson. He is a pioneer of the Open Source movement and the creator of JBoss, an open-source Java application server.

== Early life and education ==
Fleury was born in Paris, France, to a French father and Spanish mother, and came to the US in the early nineties to work on his doctoral thesis as a visiting scientist at MIT. He earned his Ph.D.from the École Polytechnique, in Paris, France in 1997. He holds a Masters in Theoretical Physics from the École Normale Supérieure. rue d'Ulm (1993). His undergraduate degree was in Mathematics from the Ecole Polytechnique, Palaiseau (1992). He served in the military, as a paratrooper, with the rank of lieutenant in the 17th Parachute Engineer Regiment.

== Software Entrepreneur: JBoss ==
Fleury worked in France for Sun Microsystems before moving to the United States where he has worked on various Java projects. Fleury's research interest focused on middleware, and he started the JBoss project in 1999. JBoss Group, LLC was incorporated in 2001 in Atlanta, Georgia. JBoss became a corporation under the name JBoss, Inc. in 2004. Fleury pioneered business models of Open Source known as Professional Open Source. After selling his company to Red Hat, Fleury became Senior Vice President and General Manager of the JBoss Division. On 9 February 2007, his departure from Red Hat was made public.

== Technology Investments ==
In 2008, Fleury started a new open source project called OpenRemote, to build home automation systems.

== The Church of Space and Poèmes Électroniques ==
Fleury co-founded the theater and electronic music act known as "The Church of Space" or "Poèmes Électroniques" (The CoS). The CoS served a 3 years residency (2016, 2017, 2019) at Moogfest Music and Arts festival. Poèmes Électroniques was featured on NPR public radio for its premiere in Atlanta in 2015. Since 2018 Poèmes Électroniques has been co-headed with Prof. Stuart Gerber of the Georgia State music dept.
