= Amazon Simple Queue Service =

Cloud-based message queuing service

- Developer: Amazon.com
- License: Proprietary software
- Website: aws.amazon.com/sqs/

Amazon Simple Queue Service (Amazon SQS) is a distributed message queuing service introduced by Amazon.com as a beta in late 2004, and generally available in mid 2006.

== API ==
Amazon provides SDKs in several programming languages, including:

- C++
- Go
- Java
- JavaScript
- Kotlin
- .NET
- PHP
- Python
- Ruby
- Rust
- Swift

A Java Message Service (JMS) 1.1 client for Amazon SQS was released in December 2014.

== Operation ==
Amazon SQS FIFO sessions are queue-based messaging systems that provide ordering guarantees within a message group or session attempt but do not necessarily guarantee ordered delivery in cases of retries or failures. In SQS FIFO, messages in the same message group are processed in order, with subsequent messages held until the preceding message is successfully processed or moved to the dead-letter queue (DLQ). Once a message is placed in the DLQ, it is no longer retried, creating a gap in the sequence. However, the remaining messages continue to be delivered in order.

== Message delivery ==
Messages can be of any type, and the data contained within is not restricted. Message bodies were initially limited to 8KB in size but was later raised to 64KB on 2010-07-01 and then 256KB on 2013-06-18. For larger messages, the user has a few options to get around this limitation. A large message can be split into multiple segments that are sent separately, or the message data can be stored using Amazon Simple Storage Service (Amazon S3) or Amazon DynamoDB with just a pointer to the data transmitted in the SQS message. Amazon has made an Extended Client Library available for this purpose.

The service supports both unlimited queues and message traffic.

== Notable usage ==
Examples of companies that use SQS extensively include:

- Dropbox
- Netflix
- Nextdoor
- Amazon.com

== See also ==
- Java Message Service
- Message queue
- Message Queuing as a Service
- Oracle Messaging Cloud Service
