= WildFly =

Java application server software

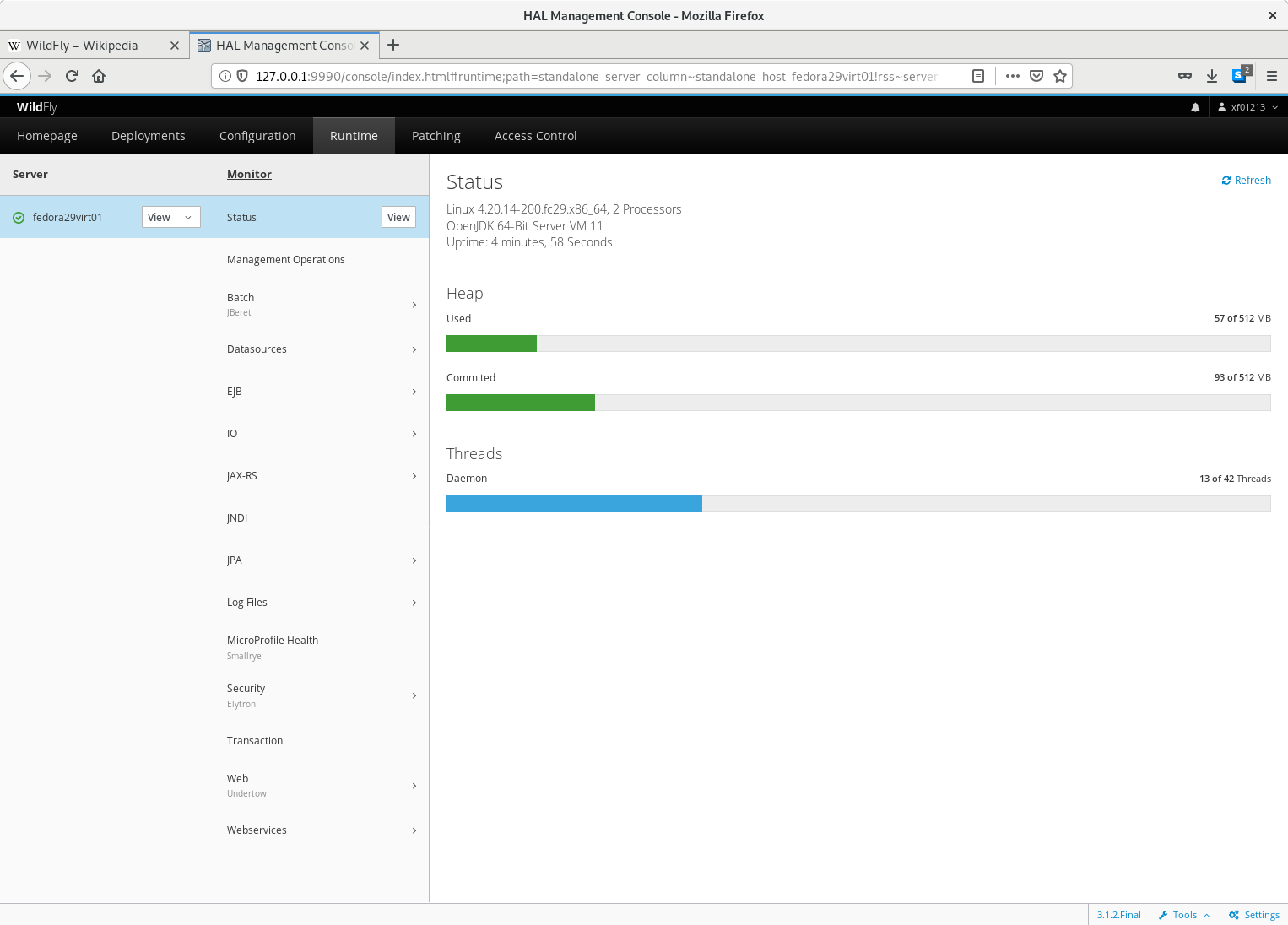
- Original author: Marc Fleury
- Developers: JBoss, Red Hat
- Stable release: 42.0.0.Final / October 22, 2026; 29 days ago
- Written in: Java
- Operating system: Cross-platform
- Type: Application server
- License: LGPLv2.1
- Website: wildfly.org
- Repository: WildFly Repository

WildFly, formerly JBoss AS or JBoss, is an application server originally developed by JBoss and now developed by Red Hat. WildFly is written in Java and implements the Java Platform, Enterprise Edition (Java EE) specification. It runs on multiple platforms.

WildFly is free and open-source software, subject to the requirements of the GNU Lesser General Public License (LGPL), version 2.1.

== Origin ==
In 1999, Marc Fleury started a free software project named EJB-OSS (stands for Enterprise Java Bean Open Source Software) implementing the EJB API from J2EE (Java 2 Enterprise Edition). Sun Microsystems asked the project to stop using the trademarked EJB within its name. EJB-OSS was then renamed to JBOSS, then JBoss later.

On November 20, 2014, JBoss Application Server was renamed WildFly. The JBoss Community and other Red Hat JBoss products like JBoss Enterprise Application Platform were not renamed.

== Features ==
Wildfly supports a number of features:

- Jakarta Persistence (JPA)
- Jakarta Enterprise Beans (EJB)
- Distributed transactions - Wildfly implements the Jakarta Transactions API (JTA).
- Representational state transfer (REST) services.
- WebSocket
- Clustering - Wildfly uses Infinispan as its distributed cache system

== See also ==
- List of application servers
- Netty (software)
- List of JBoss software
