= Event-driven SOA =

Event-driven SOA is a form of service-oriented architecture (SOA), combining the intelligence and proactiveness of event-driven architecture with the organizational capabilities found in service offerings. Before event-driven SOA, the typical SOA platform orchestrated services centrally, through pre-defined business processes, assuming that what should have already been triggered is defined in a business process. This older approach (sometimes called SOA 1.0) does not account for events that occur across, or outside of, specific business processes. Thus complex events, in which a pattern of activities—both non-scheduled and scheduled—should trigger a set of services, are not accounted for in traditional SOA 1.0 architecture.

== SOA 2.0 ==
SOA 2.0 architecture ("event-driven SOA") lets business users monitor, analyze, and enrich events to make connections among disparate events that are not at first intuitively obvious. This makes these enriched events visible to others, especially business analysts or marketing directors, and can also allow the SOA 2.0 system to automate actions that address a unique pattern.

SOA 2.0 is the ability to create high-level business events from numerous low-level system events. Events are created by filtering real-time data (from middleware, applications, databases, and Web services, for example) and infusing it with defining detail such as dependencies or causal relationships discovered by correlating other events.

If it is clear, through the enriched events that are produced by an SOA 2.0 environment, that the customer shopping cart abandonment rate has escalated in the last few days, a notification to the marketing department could initiate research into what competitors have done to cause customers to buy products elsewhere, such as whether there was a common product in most shopping carts and, if so, what prices the competition was offering.

In practice, this relationship of streamed events is processed through a causal vector engine, which performs a lookup based on recently viewed events and assigns a causal vector to an event if a relationship is discovered. If A causes B, the causal vector engine checks if B’s causal vector rule index contains a reference to A. The engine may handle events for different transactions simultaneously, perhaps in a different order than they occurred.

Unlike sequential or procedural systems (in which clients must poll for change requests), event-driven SOA allows systems and components to respond dynamically, in real time, as events occur. SOA 2.0 complements and extends SOA 1.0 by introducing long-running processing capabilities.

Long- running processing capability enables the architecture to collect various asynchronous events over a long period of time and correlate these events into causal relationships. SOA 2.0 event patterns can be designed and implemented to look for event relationships that span days, weeks, or months, and to trigger a business process to address the event pattern when certain criteria are met.

SOA 2.0 event-driven programming is structured around the concept of decoupled relationships between event producers and event consumers: an event consumer is not concerned with where or why an event occurs, but only with being invoked when the event has occurred. Systems and applications that separate event producers from event consumers typically rely on an event dispatcher, or channel. This channel contains an event queue that acts as an intermediary between event producers and event handlers.

=== Prototypical SOA 2.0 paradigm ===
The prototypical SOA 2.0 paradigm contains four essential elements:

1. multiple low-level system events that, separately, do not appear to have any relationship, but through pattern detection by comparing these many events some unusual or less obvious correlation becomes clear;
2. some amount of data enrichment by infusion of related information to each event to more clearly illustrate how the many events are related;
3. a trigger condition which when not met, the business-level event is not created, but when the trigger condition is met, the higher-level business event is created;
4. some human or automated process that is invoked when the trigger event is reached.

SOA 2.0 Web Services can be composed in two ways: orchestration and choreography. In orchestration, a central process takes control over the involved web services and coordinates the execution of different operations on the web services involved in the operation. The involved SOA 2.0 services do not know (and do not need to know) that they are part of a composition or a higher business process. Only the central coordinator of the orchestration knows this, so the orchestration is centralized with explicit definitions of operations and the order of invocation of SOA 2.0 services.

Choreography, on the other hand, does not rely on a central coordinator. Rather, each SOA 2.0 service involved in the choreography knows exactly when to execute its operations (based on defined trigger criteria) and whom to interact with. Choreography is a collaborative effort focused on exchange of messages. All participants of the choreography need to be aware of the business process, operations to execute, messages to exchange, and the timing of message exchanges.

BPEL follows the orchestration paradigm. Choreography is covered by other standards, such as WSCI (Web Services Choreography Interface) and WS-CDL (Web Services Choreography Description Language).

==== Multiple low-level system events ====
Causal relationships are inherent in the world and are intrinsic to human decision making. Human intelligence processes and gathers these relationships faster than current artificial computational capability can. One of the fundamental obstacles in artificial intelligence is the absence of an automated ability to relate events together in the way that human intuition does.

Using a Causal Vector Engine, the perception of causality can be enhanced under appropriate spatiotemporal conditions based on structural and temporal rules written into the engine. Perception of complex causal semantics, such as additive, mediated, and bidirectional causalities, needs to be coded so that the engine can distinguish between events that are related and those that only appear to be related but, in fact, are not.

The engine uses preponderant causal vector rate-of-change propagation to code the relationship among the events and establishes a partial order in which it validates the causality perceived between multiple occurrences. The engine plays and replays the event sequence in different temporal order to infer what could be related topological connections and compares these replays to rules preprogrammed by an analyst.

Multiple low-level system events are processed by the Causal Vector Engine and compared against these rules to trigger higher-level Business Events. This is done through a Causality Vector Engine (CVE) console application, which displays events in real time to business analysts. Streams of events can be observed as they occur, much like a stock ticker, and the CVE console application has several windows that list the same events in different contexts, so that business analysts can see what the CVE is doing with the relationships between them.

The Sequential window shows events in date-timestamp order, while one or more other windows show them in various orders as the CVE works through the list of rules and creates implied relationships between the events. Various buttons and controls exist in the console application that enable business analysts to create relationships between events on-the-fly and define rules that respond to these relationships.

Business analysts can infuse additional defining detail through an SQL query statement attached to a rule or event context. The CVE application works much like the stock trading applications that mutual fund managers use to manage risk. An example of a CVE application and engine can be seen in SILK.

==== Data enrichment ====
Most enterprise service bus (ESB) implementations contain a facility called "mediation". For example, mediation flows are part of the WebSphere enterprise service bus intercept. Mule also supports mediation flows. Mediation flows modify messages that are passed between existing services and clients that use those services. A mediation flow mediates or intervenes to provide functions such as message logging, data transformation, and routing; typically, these functions can be implemented using the Interception Design Pattern.

As messages pass through the ESB, the ESB enriches the messages destined for a channel that is monitoring for a high-level business event. That is, for each message, the ESB may query a database to obtain additional information about some data entity within the message. For example, based on Customer ID, the ESB mediation flow could get the zip code that the customer resides in. Or, based on the IP address of the originating request by the end-user, the ESB mediation flow could look up what country, state or county that IP address is in.

These examples represent data enrichment, the concept of adding value to existing data, based on the intent of the high-level business event to eventually be triggered.

===== Mediation flows =====
An ESB mediation flow is one of the component types in a Service Component Architecture (SCA). Like any SCA component, the program accesses a mediation flow through exports that it provides, and the mediation flow forwards messages to other external services via imports. Special kinds of imports and exports for JMS, called JMS bindings, enable developers to specify the binding configuration and write data handling code. The mediation flow consists of a series of mediation primitives that manipulate messages as they flow through the bus.

Once the developers have coded the custom binding for both export and import, they can start to focus on the mediation flow component. In the WebSphere Integration Developer assembly editor, this is done by the JMS Custom Binding Mediation Component where each operation on the flow component's interface is represented by a request and a response.

The

Service Data Objects (SDO) framework provides a unified framework for data application development. With SDO, developers do not need to be familiar with any specific API in order to access and utilize data. Through SDO, developers work with data from multiple data sources, such as relational databases, entity EJB components, XML pages, Web services, the Service Component Architecture, and JavaServer Pages pages.

Mediation flows are entirely independent from the bindings that are used in the imports and exports. The purpose of having a conversion into an SDO DataObject instance outside of the flow implementation is that mediation flows can then be built without knowledge of the protocol and format with which messages are sent to and from the mediation module.

==== Business-level trigger condition ====
A business-level trigger condition enables the SOA 2.0 architecture to establish real-time customer intelligence, marketing automation and customer loyalty solutions, among other features. Business objects model real-world entities in the architecture such as customers, accounts, loans, and travel itineraries. When the state of one of these objects changes, and a monitoring agent notices this change is significant (when compared to the list of criteria to monitor), an event is created and passed to other monitoring agents.

For example, the detection of an actual business problem or opportunity could lead to increased revenue. If a customer cancels an order, extra manufacturing capacity could reduce the profitability of the production run. An SOA 2.0 event could notify the marketing department to create a special sales campaign that would resell the excess capacity, thereby recapturing the original profitable cost-per-unit.

Monitoring agents automatically monitor events in operational business process activities as processes execute, to determine whether any immediate action needs to be taken either inside or outside the enterprise. These monitoring agents continually test for specific business conditions and changes in business operations. If necessary, the agents alert people, make recommendations, send messages to other applications or invoke whole business processes when such conditions or changes occur.

==== Resulting business process ====
A triggered business process is intended to directly support revenue growth with cost containment, responsiveness to business conditions, or ability to pursue new market opportunities. Resulting business processes could also measure operational progress toward achieving goals, control operational costs by communicating only what is needed to those who need to know, or report performance status of key processes to key decision makers.

== SOA 2.0 conceptual examples ==
=== Abandoned shopping cart ===
For example, a CRM event could be constructed from an "abandoned shopping cart" message (parsing the transaction, customer ID, and time), using other filters to extract the value of goods in the cart and tapping the correlation capabilities of the system to add causal indicators such as whether the commerce site was suffering performance problems. The CRM event might also include customer value or rank from the customer database.

=== Engineering defect ===
For another example, based on the types of independent service calls received, the SOA 2.0 platform could identify a product defect by detecting the underlying pattern of the separate complaints, then triggering an alert to engineering or production of the possible defect.

== SOA 2.0 implementations ==
One mechanism that can be used from most SOA 1.0 Enterprise Service Bus implementations is the publish/subscribe facility. When ESB functionality is implemented as Pub/Sub messages, no advanced knowledge of system events is needed to create SOA 2.0 message patterns. After an enterprise has implemented many Publish functions, SOA middleware analysts can determine which of the available Publish messages could be assembled into a unique pattern to detect an SOA 2.0-enriched trigger.

Causal Vector Engine (CVE) mechanics are implemented simply, with an expandable view of SQL constructs written in stored procedures. If A causes B, and causality must occur within N number of transactions, then SQL ORDER BY timestamp clause creates a result set that increments a counter of all transactions that occurred within a timeframe, N number of matching B to occurrence A transactions. The creation of additional stored procedures is accomplished through the CVE console application or by using any standard database developer's toolkit.

=== Medical applications ===
Domain algorithms, such as fever/flu/infection domain logic in the cited reference, are used to derive SQL code that applies the selected business rules to the use case. Using CVEs in SOA environments improves business agility because the application of SOA 2.0 principles identifies business opportunities that would have otherwise been missed or identified much later.

Functional magnetic resonance imaging (fMRI) using Granger causality analysis (GCA) detects causal effects among brain regions. The results of one sample test demonstrated a positive causal effect between rFIC and the dorsal anterior cingulate cortex (dACC).

=== Oracle Business Intelligence ===
The Oracle CVE Analytical Engine uses a set of theoretical models, each of which evaluates some or all of the data. When a business analyst configures causal factors, the analyst specifies criteria indicating which models should consider which causal factor.

== See also ==
- Service-oriented architecture
- Enterprise Mashup Markup Language (EMML)
