= JBoss Enterprise Application Platform =

Web application framework

- Developer: Red Hat / IBM
- Stable release: 8.1.5 / March 17, 2026; 6 months ago
- Written in: Java
- Operating system: Cross-platform
- Type: Application server, Web application framework
- License: GNU Lesser General Public License
- Website: www.redhat.com/en/technologies/jboss-middleware/application-platform

The JBoss Enterprise Application Platform (or JBoss EAP) is a subscription-based/ open-source Jakarta EE-based application server runtime platform used for building, deploying, and hosting highly-transactional Java applications and services developed and maintained by Red Hat. The JBoss Enterprise Application Platform is part of Red Hat's Enterprise Middleware portfolio of software. Because it is Java-based, the JBoss application server operates across platforms; it is usable on any operating system that supports Java. JBoss Enterprise Application Platform was originally called JBoss and was developed by the eponymous company JBoss, which was acquired by Red Hat in 2006.

Summer 2025, Red Hat announced that the JBoss and similar product lines and support contracts will remain at Red Hat, but the middleware development team would move to parent company IBM - and come under the same management as the WebSphere development team.

== Product components and features ==
The current major generation of Red Hat JBoss EAP is JBoss EAP 8, which introduces full compatibility with Jakarta EE 10 specifications and drops support for legacy Java SE 8 runtime environments. Rather than minor point releases, maintenance updates within the version 8 lifecycle are delivered via a rolling stream of Cumulative Updates (such as JBoss EAP 8.0 Update 2).The previous major generation, JBoss EAP 7, peaked at minor version 7.4. The entire EAP 7 stream officially transitioned out of standard maintenance support on June 30, 2025, entering a restricted Extended Life Support (ELS-1) phase.

Key features:^{[5]}

- Complete compatibility with the Jakarta EE 10 platform specification (including Web Profile and Full Platform).
- Undertow: A flexible, high-performance web server and servlet container written in Java, replacing Apache Tomcat to handle Jakarta Servlet and Jakarta Server Pages (JSP) web specifications.
- WildFly Elytron: A unified, modular security framework providing centralized authentication, authorization, and cryptographic management across the application server ecosystem.
- Distributed caching, clustering, and high-availability session replication provided natively by the Infinispan subsystem.
- Enterprise messaging capabilities via the ActiveMQ Artemis subsystem, supporting the Jakarta Messaging specification.
- Modern web services stack providing support for Jakarta RESTful Web Services (REST) and Jakarta XML Web Services (WS).
- Integration services including Jakarta Connectors (JCA) and Java Database Connectivity (JDBC) for enterprise data sources.
- Administrative management capabilities via a Command Line Interface (CLI), XML configuration, and web-based management console.

Key components:

- WildFly/JBoss Core Runtime: The modular, lightweight application server core based on the JBoss Modules classloading architecture.
- Hibernate ORM: The enterprise object/relational mapping and persistence framework implementing Jakarta Persistence.
- Undertow: The high-performance, non-blocking web server handling servlet and web specifications.
- ActiveMQ Artemis: The native, high-performance messaging subsystem implementing Jakarta Messaging.

Lists of components, features, and standards supported are available on the official Red Hat customer portal.

== Licensing and pricing ==
JBoss itself is free and open-source, but Red Hat charges to provide a support subscription for JBoss Enterprise Middleware. Red Hat allows the use of JBoss EAP for development, but to obtain support in production a support subscription is required and customizations are not supported.

== Historical portfolios and retired variants ==
During earlier major lifecycles (specifically JBoss EAP 4 and EAP 5), Red Hat distributed secondary software bundles and frameworks as part of the broader JBoss Enterprise Middleware portfolio. These variants have since been retired, consolidated into the main runtime, or replaced by modern cloud-native projects:

- JBoss Enterprise Web Platform (EWP): A legacy, lighter-weight footprint of the server designed for mid-sized workloads, utilizing a slimmed-down application server profile.
- JBoss Enterprise Portal Platform (EPP): A retired enterprise web portal framework that bundled GateIn Portal and the JBoss Portlet Bridge to run JavaServer Faces (JSF) within portlets.
- JBoss Web Framework Kit: A discontinued collection of standalone web frameworks that bundled Google Web Toolkit (GWT), RichFaces, Apache Struts, and the Spring Framework.
- JBoss Cache: A legacy replicated, transactional Java object cache layer that was fully replaced by the modern Infinispan subsystem starting with JBoss EAP 6.
- JBoss Netty: An asynchronous, event-driven New I/O (NIO) framework used in older releases to build network protocol servers.

== See also ==
- WildFly, the JBoss EAP upstream project
- List of JBoss software
- Comparison of business integration software
- Comparison of application servers

== Bibliography ==
- Marrs, Tom; Davis, Scott (July 1, 2009). JBoss At Work: A Practical Guide. O'Reilly. p. 306. ISBN 978-0596007348.
- Stark, Scott; Fleury, Marc; Richards, Norman (April 30, 2005). JBoss 4.0 The Official Guide. Sams. p. 648. ISBN 9780672326486.
