= JBoss (company) =

American software company

- Founded: 2004
- Headquarters: United States
- Products: Software

JBoss also known as JBoss Group, LLC and JBoss, Inc was a startup based in Atlanta, Georgia. It produced an open source Java application server called JBoss and later JBoss Enterprise Application Platform as well as a suite of related products. In 2006 it was acquired by Red Hat for at least 350 million US dollars.

== History ==
Marc Fleury started the JBoss project in 1999. JBoss Group, LLC was incorporated in 2001 in Atlanta, Georgia. JBoss became a corporation under the name JBoss, Inc. in 2004. It was a C corporation headquartered in Atlanta, Georgia, that owned the copyright and trademarks associated with JBoss.

In early 2006 Oracle Corporation, a major developer of database software, sought to buy JBoss Inc. for an estimated $400 million. The acquisition would have enabled Oracle to compete with rivals BEA Systems and IBM in the middleware market (Oracle eventually acquired BEA in April 2008). On April 10, 2006, however, Red Hat announced that they would buy JBoss for at least $350 million, with a top-up of $70 million depending on JBoss' financial performance. The acquisition was completed in June 2006. Fleury left Red Hat after eight months.
