= Comparison of business integration software =

This article is a comparison of notable business integration and business process automation software.

== General ==
=== Scope ===
Scope of this comparison:

- Service-oriented architecture implementations;
- Message-oriented middleware and message brokers;
- Enterprise service bus implementations;
- BPEL implementations;
- Enterprise application integration software.

=== General information ===
Software	Creator	Edition	Release date	Cost (USD)	Open source	Software license	Implementation
AdroitLogic UltraESB	AdroitLogic	17.01	2017-01	Subscription based licensing and support or perpetual licensing	No	Proprietary	Enterprise Service Bus
Anypoint Platform	MuleSoft	Mule 3.7	2015-06	Sold as software as a subscription with various packaged options to serve different use cases. The pricing scales with usage as measured by number of cores on-premises and virtual cores in the cloud.	No	Dual (CPAL or proprietary	
Apache Camel	Apache Software Foundation	2.23.3	2018-11-29	Free/Commercial support available	Yes	Apache Software License	
Apache Kafka	Apache Software Foundation	0.10.20	2017-02	Free / Commercial support available	Yes	Apache Software License	
Artix ESB	Progress Software	5.x	2003		No	Proprietary	
Automation Anywhere Integration Pack	Automation Anywhere	6.1	2011-02	$5500	No	Proprietary	
BizTalk Server	Microsoft	2016	2016-12	Enterprise Edition: $10,835 per core; Standard Edition: $2,485 per core; Branch Edition: $620 per core (minimum 4 cores required); Developer Edition – per seat, available under Volume or MSDN licence.	No	Proprietary	Enterprise Application Integration, Hub and Spoke architecture, Cloud ready
Fuse – Enterprise Camel	Red Hat	7.0	2018		Yes	based on Apache Software License	
IBM Integration Bus (formerly WebSphere Message Broker )	IBM	10.0	2015-03	Varies between approximately 100 and 850 per Value Unit	No	Proprietary	Enterprise Service Bus
Informatica Power Center	Informatica	8.5	2007-10	Varies: 50,000 – 100,000 generally	No	Proprietary	
JBoss Enterprise Service Bus (ESB)	JBoss, a division of Red Hat, Inc.	4.12	2013-03	Free / Commercial support available	Yes	GNU LGPL	Enterprise Service Bus, Replaced by JBoss Fuse
JBoss Enterprise SOA Platform	JBoss, a division of Red Hat, Inc.	5.1	2011-02	Free / Commercial support available	Yes	GNU LGPL	Replaced by JBoss Fuse
Magic xpi Integration Platform	Magic Software Enterprises	4.0	2015-05		No	Proprietary	
Openadaptor	The Software Conservancy	3.4.6	2011-02	Free	Yes	variant of MIT	
OpenESB	OpenESB Community	3.2.2	2014-12-02	Free / Enterprise Edition with commercial support	Yes	CDDL	
OpenLink Virtuoso	OpenLink Software	7.2.5.1	2018-08-15	Varies	Yes	Dual (GPL or proprietary)	
Oracle BPEL Process Manager (Note: Part of Oracle SOA Suite.)	Oracle Corporation	12.1.3.0.0	2014-06	Varies	No	Proprietary	
Oracle Enterprise Service Bus	Oracle Corporation	12.1.3.0.0	2014-06	Varies	No	Proprietary	
PEtALS ESB	OW2 Consortium	3.1.3	2011-07	Free / Commercial support available	Yes	GNU LGPL	
Sonic ESB	Progress Software	8.x	2011		No	Proprietary	Enterprise Service Bus
SAP NetWeaver Process Integration (short SAP PI)	SAP AG	7.5	2011	Varies (Note: CPU-based pricing.)	No	Proprietary	
Sun Java Composite Application Platform Suite	Sun Microsystems	6	2008-06	$100 per employee per year subscription, perpetual per socket licensing available	No (Note: Components from the Open ESB open-source community are productized in Java CAPS.)	Proprietary	
TrackerSuite.Net	Automation Centre	4.0	2012-06	Based on number of users and modules utilized. Available as SaaS, or as a licensed installation.	No	Proprietary	
Unify NXJ	Unify Corporation	11			No	Proprietary	
webMethods Integration Server	IBM	9.0	2013-05	varies	No	Proprietary	Enterprise Application Integration, Hub and Spoke architecture, API Management Cloud ready
WebSphere Message Broker (Note: Now known as IBM Integration Bus.)	IBM	8.0	2011-10	No longer marketed under this name – replacement name is IBM Integration Bus	No	Proprietary	Enterprise Service Bus
WSO2 Enterprise Integrator	WSO2	6.4	2018	Free / Commercial support available	Yes	Apache License 2.0	Enterprise Service Bus, Message Broker, Application Server, Business Process Server, Data Services Server
WSO2 Enterprise Service Bus (ESB)	WSO2	5.0.0	2016	Free / Commercial support available	Yes	Apache Software License	

== Compatibility and interoperability ==
=== Operating system support ===
Software	Microsoft Windows									Darwin– macOS	Linux				IBM				HP-UX	illumos– Solaris
Software	2000	XP	Vista	2003 Server	2008 R2 Server	2008 Server	2012 Server	7–64 bit	8–64 bit	Darwin– macOS	Red Hat	SUSE	Ubuntu	CentOS	AIX	OS/390	IBM i	z/OS	HP-UX	illumos– Solaris
Anypoint Platform	No	No	No	Yes	Yes	Yes	Yes	Yes	Yes	Yes	Yes	Yes	Yes	Yes	Yes	No	No	No	Yes	Yes
Artix ESB	with SP3, SP4	with SP1, SP2		Yes						No	Yes	Yes			Yes		No	Yes	Yes	Yes
Automation Anywhere Integration Pack	Yes	Yes	Yes	Yes						No	No	No			No	No	No	No	No	No
BizTalk Server	Yes (Note: Versions pre-2006 R2 only. SP4 needed for 2004, 2006.)	Yes (Note: 32-bit: versions pre-2010, excluding 2000. SP 1 needed for 2004. SP2 needed for 2006, 2006 R2. SP3 needed for 2009. 64-bit: version from 2006–2009. SP2 needed for 2006 R2. SP3 needed for 2009.)	Yes (Note: Versions from 2006 R2 to 2010. SP1 needed for 2009. SP2 needed for 2010.)	Yes (Note: Versions from 2002 (x32) or 2006 R2 (x64) to 2009. SP1 needed for 2006, 2006 R2, 2009.)	Yes (Note: 2010 and later. SP1 needed for 2013.)	Yes (Note: 2009 and 2010.)	Yes (Note: 2013 and later.)	Yes	Yes	No	No	No			No		No	No	No	No
Flow Software	Yes	Yes	Yes	Yes	Yes	Yes	Yes	Yes		No	No	No			No	No	No	No	No	No
IBM Integration Bus	No	No	No	No	Yes	Yes	Yes	Yes	Yes	No	Yes	Yes	Yes	No	Yes	No	No	Yes	Yes	Yes
JBoss Enterprise Service Bus (ESB)	Yes	Yes	Yes	Yes						Yes	Yes	Yes			Yes				Yes	Yes
JBoss Enterprise SOA Platform	Yes	Yes	Yes	Yes						Yes	Yes	Yes			Yes				Yes	Yes
Informatica Power Center	Yes	Yes	Yes	Yes							Yes	Yes			Yes		Yes	Yes	Yes	Yes
Magic xpi Integration Platform	No	No	No	No	Yes	Yes	Yes	Yes	Yes	No	Yes	Yes	Yes	Yes	Yes	No	No	No	No	No
Openadaptor	Yes	Yes		Yes						Yes	Yes	Yes			Yes				Yes	Yes
OpenESB	Yes	Yes		Yes						Yes	Yes	Yes			Yes	No	No	No	Yes	Yes
OpenLink Virtuoso	Yes	Yes	Yes	Yes	Yes	Yes	Yes	Yes	Yes	Yes	Yes	Yes	Yes	Yes	Yes	No	No	No	Yes	Yes
Oracle BPEL Process Manager	Yes	Yes		Yes	Yes		Yes	Yes			Yes	Yes			5L		No	No	Yes	Yes
Oracle Enterprise Service Bus	Yes	Yes		Yes	Yes		Yes	Yes			Yes	Yes			Yes		No	No	Yes	Yes
PEtALS ESB	Yes	Yes		Yes						Yes	Yes	Yes			Yes	No	No	No	Yes	Yes
SAP Exchange Infrastructure	Yes	Yes	Yes	Yes						Yes	Yes	Yes			Yes	No	Yes	Yes	Yes	Yes
Sonic ESB	Yes	Yes	Yes	Yes							Yes	Yes			Yes	No	No	No	Yes	Yes
Spagic	Yes	Yes		Yes						Yes	Yes	Yes			Yes	No	No	No	Yes	Yes
Sun Java Composite Application Platform Suite	Yes	Yes (Note: For development.)		Yes							Yes	Yes			Yes	No	No	No	Yes	Yes
TrackerSuite.Net	No	with SP2	Yes	Yes																
Unify NXJ	with SP4	with SP1		Yes						No	Yes	Yes			5.3		No	No	Yes	Yes
WSO2 Enterprise Service Bus (ESB)	Yes	Yes	Yes	Yes	Yes	Yes	Yes	Yes	Yes	Yes	Yes	Yes	Yes	Yes	Yes					Yes

=== Hardware support ===
Supported hardware depends on supported operating systems.

=== Database support ===
Software	API		Sybase		Apache Derby	IBM				Firebird	Microsoft		MySQL	Oracle	PostgreSQL
Software	ODBC	JDBC	ASA	ASE	Apache Derby	IBM Db2	Db2 for i	Cloudscape	Informix	Firebird	SQL Server	Azure SQL	MySQL	Oracle	PostgreSQL
Anypoint Platform	No	Yes	Yes	Yes	Yes	Yes	Yes	Yes	Yes	Yes	Yes	Yes	Yes	Yes	Yes
Artix ESB															
Automation Anywhere Integration Pack	Yes	Yes	Yes	Yes					Yes		Yes		Yes	Yes	
BizTalk Server	Yes	Yes (Note: Via native SQL adapter if JDBC drivers are installed.)	Yes	Yes	Yes	Yes	Yes	Yes	Yes	Yes (Note: Via BizTalk Utilities Adapter.)	Yes	Yes	Yes (Note: Via ODBC adapter or via BizTalk Utilities Adapter.)	Yes	Yes
IBM Integration Bus	Yes	Yes	No	Yes	No	Yes	Yes	No	Yes	No	Yes	Yes	No	Yes	No
Informatica Power Center	Yes	Yes	Yes	Yes		Yes	Yes		Yes		Yes		Yes	Yes	
JBoss Enterprise Service Bus (ESB)	No	Yes		Yes	Yes	Yes	No	Yes	Yes	Yes	Yes		Yes	Yes	
JBoss Enterprise SOA Platform	No	Yes		Yes	Yes	Yes	No	Yes	Yes	Yes	Yes		Yes		
Magic xpi Integration Platform	Yes	Yes	No	No	No	Yes	Yes	No	No	No	Yes	Yes	Yes	Yes	Yes
Openadaptor		Yes				Yes			Yes		Yes		Yes	Yes	
OpenESB		Yes	Yes		Yes	Yes		Yes	Yes		Yes		Yes	Yes	
OpenLink Virtuoso	Yes	Yes	Yes	Yes	Yes	Yes	Yes	Yes	Yes	Yes	Yes	Yes	Yes	Yes	Yes
Oracle BPEL Process Manager															
Oracle Enterprise Service Bus															
PEtALS ESB													Yes		
SAP Exchange Infrastructure		Yes				Yes					Yes			Yes	
Sun Java Composite Application Platform Suite	Yes	Yes	Yes		Yes	Yes		Yes	Yes		Yes		Yes	Yes	
Unify NXJ															
WSO2 Enterprise Service Bus (ESB)	Yes	Yes	Yes	Yes	Yes	Yes	Yes		Yes		Yes		Yes	Yes	

== See also ==
- List of application servers
- List of BPEL engines
- List of BPMN 2.0 engines
