= Fuse Mediation Router =

- Developer: Red Hat
- Stable release: 2.6
- Written in: Java
- Operating system: Cross-platform
- Type: Web services, SOA
- License: based on Apache License 2.0
- Website: https://www.jboss.org/products/fuse.html

Fuse Mediation Router is an open source tool for integrating services using Enterprise Integration Patterns based on Apache Camel for use in enterprise IT organizations. It is certified, productized and fully supported by the people who wrote the code. Fuse Mediation Router uses a standard method of notation to go from diagram to implementation without coding.

Fuse Mediation Router is a rule-based routing and process mediation engine that combines the ease of basic POJO development with the clarity of the standard Enterprise Integration Patterns. It can be deployed inside any container or be used stand-alone, and works directly with any kind of transport or messaging model to rapidly integrate existing services and applications.

Fuse Mediation Router is now a part of Red Hat JBoss Fuse.

== Tooling ==
FuseSource offers graphical, Eclipse-based tooling for Apache Camel for download.

== See also ==
- Message-oriented middleware
- Enterprise messaging system
- Enterprise Integration Patterns
- Service-oriented architecture
- Event-driven SOA
