= Java Caps =

Enterprise service bus software

Java Composite Application Platform Suite (Java CAPS) is a standards-based enterprise service bus software suite from Oracle Corporation. The suite has several components that help to integrate existing applications and deliver new business services in a service-oriented architecture environment. It is a Java EE compliant platform and provides application-to-application integration, business-to-business integration, business process management along with integrated human workflow, an Enterprise Information Portal, extract transform and load (ETL), business activity monitoring and composite application development.

== History ==
Java CAPS was originally a product of Software Technologies Corporation, which later became SeeBeyond Technology Corporation. Initially, the product was named DataGate, renamed to eGate in the late 1990s with a new distributed architecture. Monk, a LISP variant, was used for message translation.

eGate 4.5 was released in 2001 with enhanced support of Java, including introduction of Java Message Service.

A new architecture based on J2EE (now Java EE) was launched in 2003 with version 5.0, using an IDE based on NetBeans. The suite was again renamed as Integrated Composite Application Network Suite (ICAN). The Table Runtime Environment (TRE) upgraded DataGate 3.6 to take advantage of eGate 5.0 tools, such as Enterprise Manager.

=== Java CAPS 5.1 ===
After Sun Microsystems acquired SeeBeyond in 2005, the name was changed to Sun Java Composite Application Platform Suite (Java CAPS).

eGate Integrator provides the core integration functionality. Other products in the suite include eInsight Business Process Manager, eVision Studio, ePortal Composer, eTL Integrator, eXchange Integrator, eView Studio, eIndex Global Identifier Composite Application, and eBAM Studio.

Another major feature of Java CAPS is its adapters, known as eWays. These adapters are JCA compliant and allow the suite to interact with external systems.

The suite comprises adapters, libraries, and an IDE for designing, writing, monitoring, and testing business processes. The main components are:

- Repository: A version control system that allows shared projects, version history, and file-lock capabilities.
- Enterprise Designer: An IDE to browse the repository and create business processes, collaborations, connectivity maps, and deployment profiles. Business processes are defined with BPEL. BPEL is not tied specifically to web services; rather, it defines the execution of activities, inputs/outputs, and possible exceptions in the message flow.
- Logical Host: Hosts the applications deployed in it. Until Java CAPS 5, Sun Java System Application Server 9 was used. In version 6, the host became GlassFish to support JEE. Typically, the Logical Host runs on a dedicated machine and when started, refers to a domain, which is an instance of the Sun Enterprise Service Bus.
- Enterprise Manager: A web portal to monitor the information flow through the BPEL diagrams, server logs, activity details, business processes' parameters and data.

=== Java CAPS 6 ===
In 2008, Java CAPS 6 was launched including NetBeans 6.1, GlassFish v2, and OpenESB v2.

Java CAPS 6 has some distinct features when compared to Java CAPS 5.1.x:

- NetBeans 6.1 is used for the IDE. NetBeans 6.1 has plugins to support the standard Java CAPS 5.1.3 editors, and has a unified project view, editors for Java Collaboration Definition, BPEL etc. and a runtime environment of IDE.
- Sun Java System Application Server 9.1 (based on GlassFish v2) is used as the runtime environment.
- Provides support for Java Business Integration (JBI). JBI has two types of components: binding components and service engines. Both JBI container and EE container are in Sun app server. The JBI Bridge enables interoperability between Java EE and JBI components.
- Supports the following messaging servers: Sun SeeBeyond JMS IQ Manager (stcms), Sun Java Message Service Grid, and Sun Java MQ 4.1.
- Provides support for sub Java collaborations, in which a collaboration can call another collaboration.
- Includes installation enhancement (wizard-based installer) and management and monitoring improvements.

In 2009, Java CAPS 6.2 was launched with NetBeans IDE 6.5.1 and GlassFish Enterprise Server 2.1 patch 2. This version also introduced an adapter for HL7 messaging.

In 2010, Sun Microsystems was acquired by Oracle Corporation. In 2011, Oracle released Java CAPS 6.3, which includes NetBeans IDE 6.9 and GlassFish Enterprise Server 2.1.1.

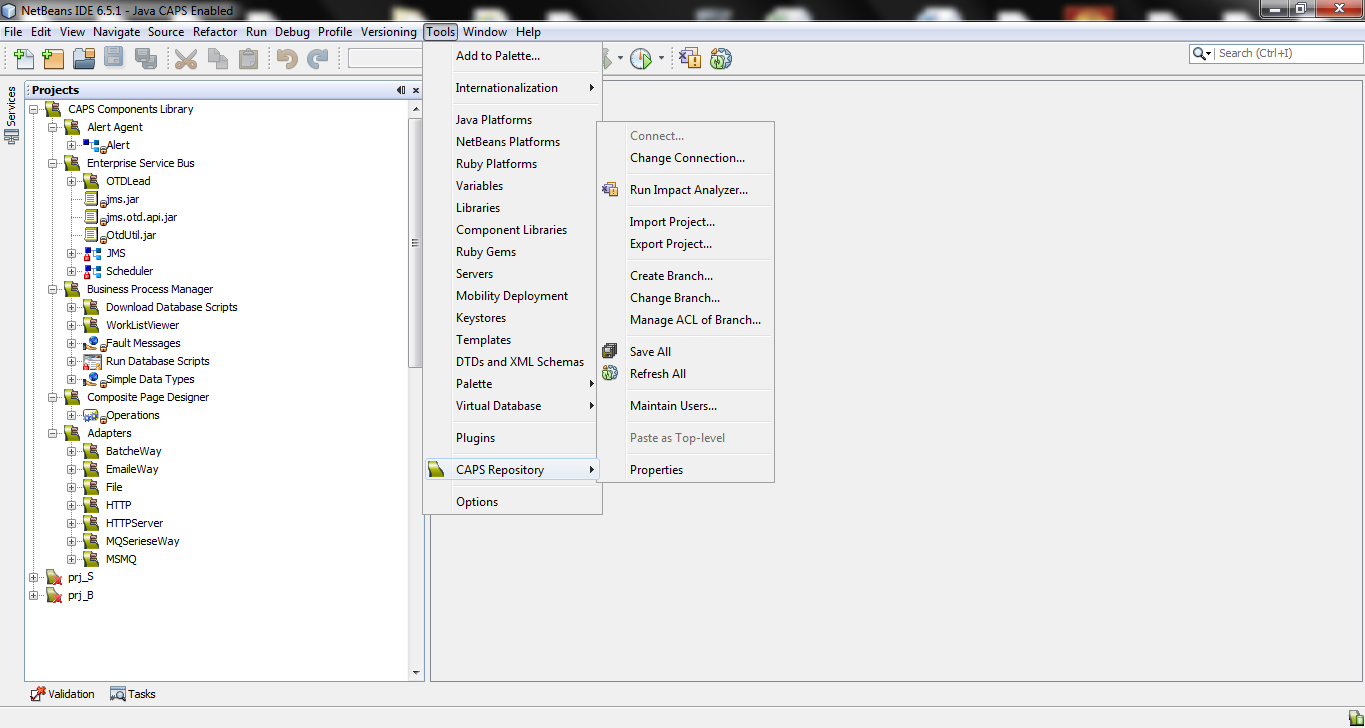
Java CAPS projects, Component Library and Repository option in NetBeans

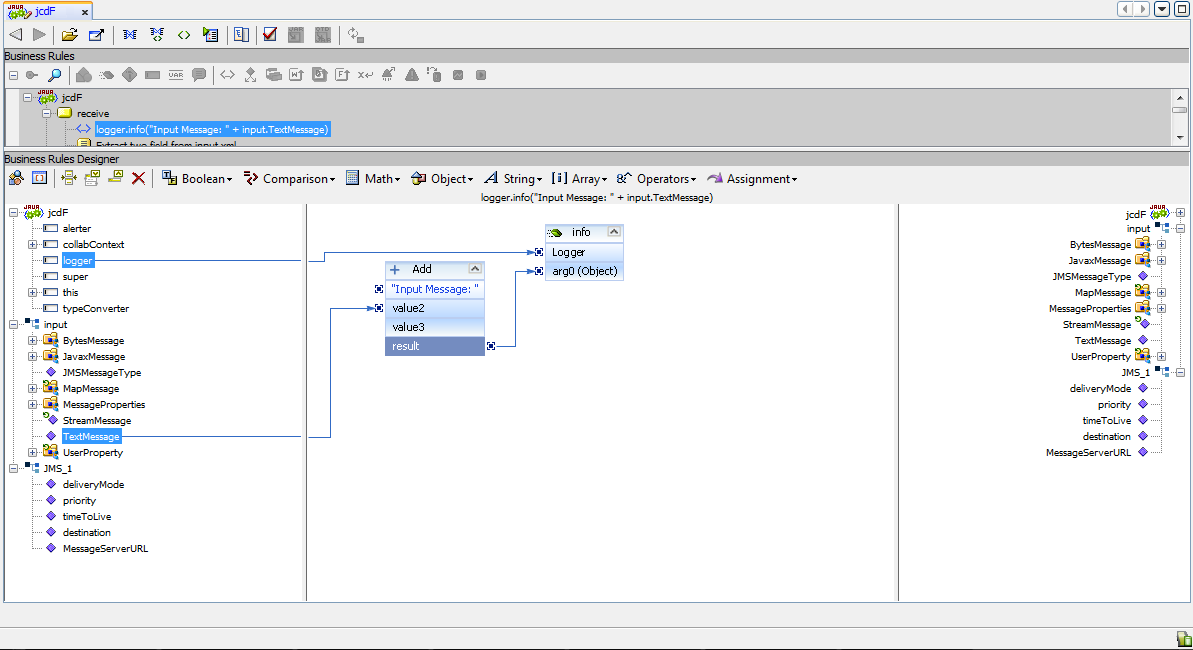
Enterprise Designer includes business rules and business rules designer

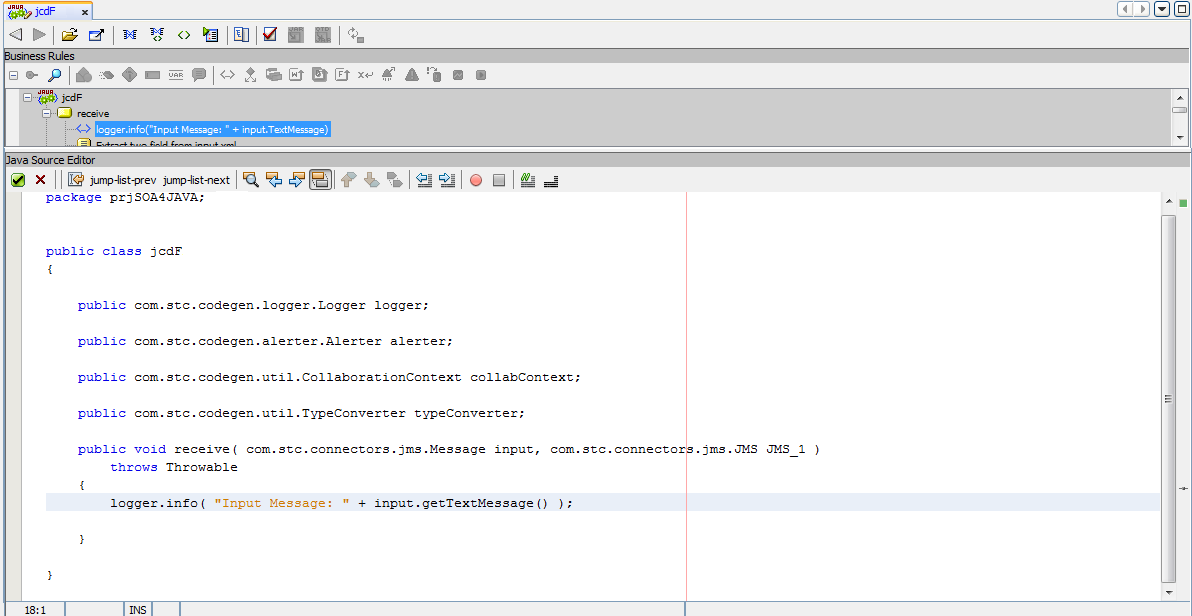
Enterprise Designer includes Java Source Code Editor

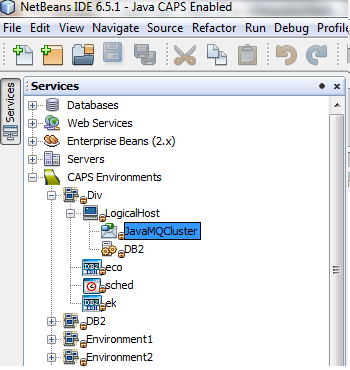
Java CAPS environments in NetBeans Services includes Logical Host and other components

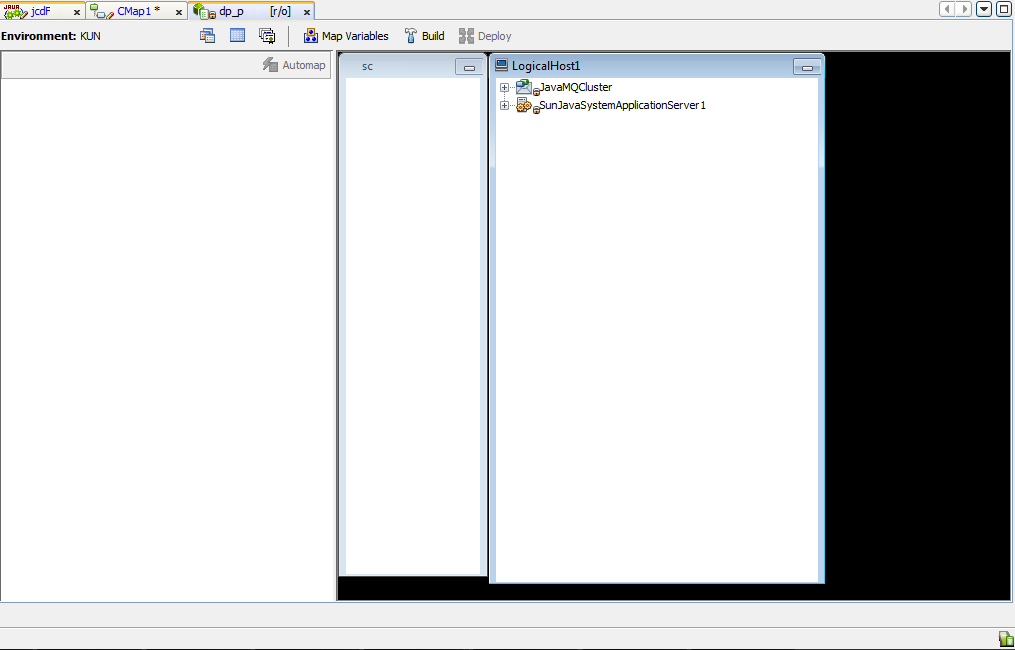
Java CAPS deployment profile

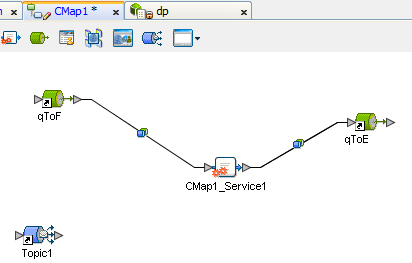
Java CAPS connectivity map

== Future of Java CAPS ==
After the Sun acquisition, Oracle incorporated features and functions of Sun SOA products to Oracle SOA products. Oracle offers tools that help in the migration of Java CAPS projects to Oracle SOA Suite. The premier support of Java CAPS 6.3 was extended until April 2016. Oracle does not promote the product anymore, and pushes users to migrate to Oracle SOA Suite.

OpenESB, the open-source version of Java CAPS, is backed by a community and can be an alternative for companies that want to protect their investments.

== Product Lifecycle ==
Release	GA Date	Premier Support Ends	Extended Support Ends	Sustaining Support Ends
5.1.0	Mar 2006	Dec 2007	Not Available	Indefinite
5.1.1	Jun 2006	May 2007	Not Available	Indefinite
5.1.2	Oct 2006	Jun 2008	Not Available	Indefinite
5.1.3	Not Available	Jan 2014	Jan 2017	Indefinite
6.0.x	Jun 2008	Jan 2012	Not Available	Indefinite
6.1.x	Oct 2009	Jan 2014	Jan 2017	Indefinite
6.2.x	Oct 2009	Jan 2014	Jan 2017	Indefinite
6.3.x	Apr 2011	Apr 2016	Apr 2017	Indefinite

== See also ==
- Oracle SOA Suite
- SeeBeyond Technology Corporation
- Business Process Execution Language
- Java EE Connector Architecture
