= MFL =

MFL may refer to:

== Sport leagues ==
=== Association football ===
- Macedonian Football League (disambiguation)
- Malaysian Football League
- Manchester Football League, English league
- Media Football League, Russian league
- MFL League, Turks and Caicos league
- Midland Football League, English league founded in 2014
- Midland Football League (1994), English league founded as the Staffordshire Senior League in 1984
- Media Football League, Russian league
- Montenegrin First League, top division association football league in Montenegro

=== Gridiron football ===
- Maritime Football League, Canadian football league
- Midwest Football League (1935–1940), American football league
- Midwest Football League (1962–1978), American football league

=== Other sports ===
- Mallee Football League, Australian rules football league in South Australia
- Millewa Football League, Australian rules football league in Victoria
- Montenegrin First League, water polo
- Montenegrin First League, women's handball
- Montenegrin First League, men's hanbdall
- Mortlock Football League, Australian rules football league in Western Australia
- Murray Football League, former name of the Murray Football Netball League, Australian rules football and netball league

== Technology ==
- Magnetic flux leakage, a steel corrosion testing method
- Male flare fitting, in home brewing
- Message Format Language, in computing

== Other uses ==
- Madras Fertilizers Limited, a partly publicly owned fertilizer manufacturer in Chennai, Tamil Nadu, India
- Manitoba Federation of Labour, a Canadian trade union centre
- Market–Frankford Line, a rapid transit rail line in Philadelphia, Pennsylvania, US
- Modern foreign languages, teaching living second languages to children
- Monona, Farmersburg, and Luana, Iowa
