= Fuse Services Framework =

Open source web services platform

- Developer: Red Hat
- Stable release: 2.3
- Written in: Java
- Operating system: Cross-platform
- Type: Web services, SOA
- License: based on Apache License 2.0
- Website: "Fuse". 5 December 2019.

Fuse Services Framework is an open source SOAP and REST web services platform based on Apache CXF for use in enterprise IT organizations. It is productized and supported by the Fuse group at FuseSource Corp. Fuse Services Framework service-enables new and existing systems for use in enterprise SOA infrastructure.

Fuse Services Framework is a pluggable, small-footprint engine that creates high performance, secure and robust services in minutes using front-end programming APIs like JAX-WS and JAX-RS. It supports multiple transports and bindings and is extensible so developers can add bindings for additional message formats so all systems can work together without having to communicate through a centralized server.

Fuse Services Framework is now a part of Red Hat JBoss Fuse.

Fabric8 is a free Apache 2.0 Licensed upstream community for the JBoss Fuse product from Red Hat.

== See also ==
- Fuse ESB
- Message-oriented middleware
- Enterprise messaging system
- Enterprise Integration Patterns
- Service-oriented architecture
- Event-driven SOA
