= Winston Damarillo =

Filipino-American businessman

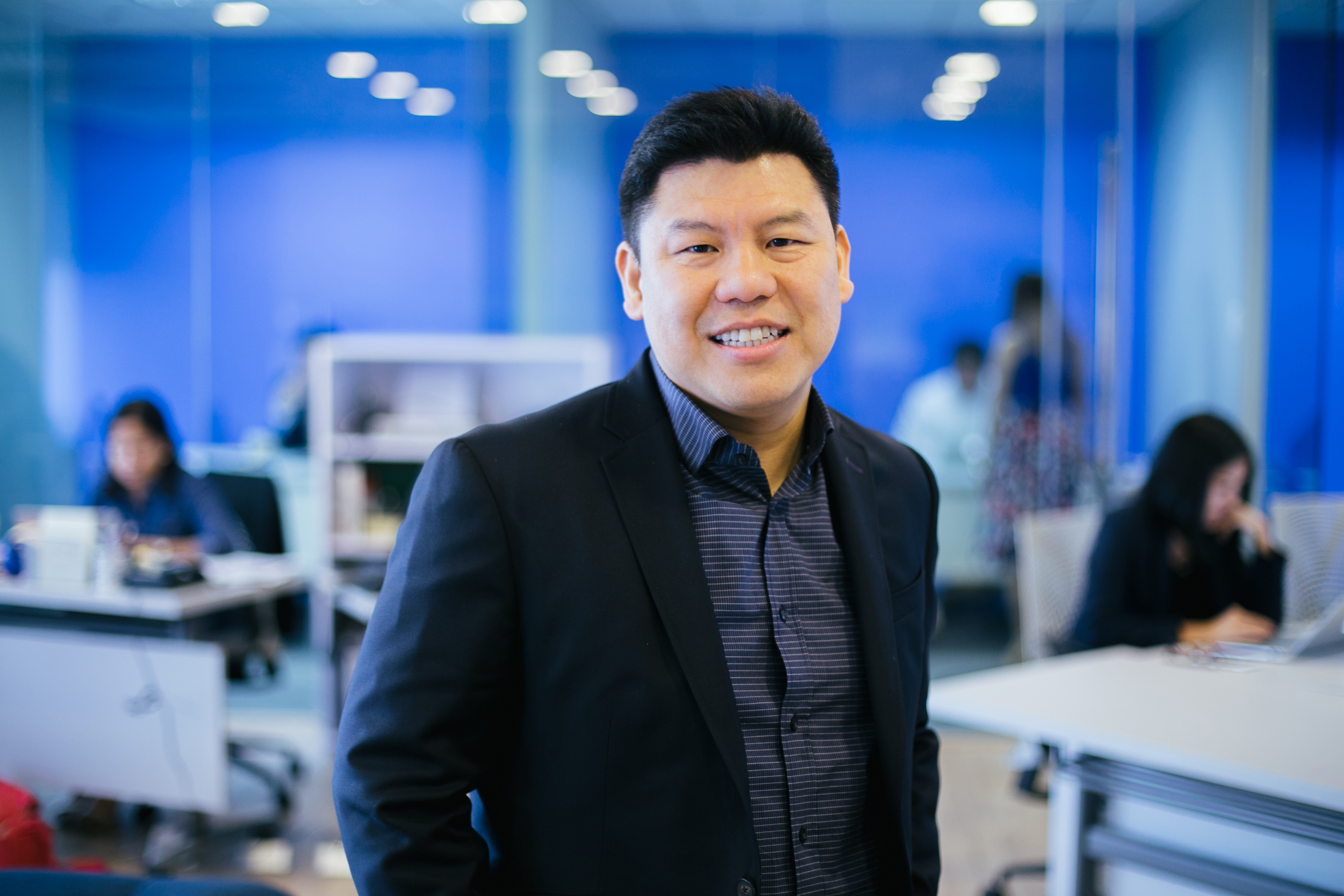
- Born: Bohol, Philippines.
- Education: De La Salle University
- Occupation(s): CEO, entrepreneur

Winston Damarillo is a Filipino-American businessman. He was born in Bohol, in the Philippines. He completed a BS in industrial and mechanical engineering from the De La Salle University in 1990.

He moved to the US, and went to work at Intel in Hillsboro, Oregon in 1992. After engineering and sales positions, he moved to Intel Capital, which invested in software companies.

Damarillo became an entrepreneur and venture capitalist. He sold companies such as: Gluecode Software, an open source software company which was acquired by IBM in 2005, Logicblaze, acquired by Iona Technologies in 2007, and Webtide, acquired by Intalio in 2009.

Damarillo became the chief strategy officer of the PLDT group in May 2015. At the time he was executive chairman of Amihan Global Strategies.
