= Orbix =

Orbix may refer to:

- Orbix (toy), a battery-operated puzzle toy from Milton Bradley released in 1995
- Orbix (software)
