= JNBridge =

JNBridge, LLC
- Type: Private
- Industry: Software
- Founded: Boulder, Colorado, United States (2001)
- Key people: Wayne Citrin (Chairman)
- Products: JNBridge Pro; JMS Adapter for .NET; JMS Adapter for BizTalk Server
- Website: jnbridge.com

JNBridge is a privately owned independent software vendor that provides interoperability software between Java and Microsoft .NET frameworks. The company was founded in 2001 and is based in Boulder, Colorado, USA.

== History ==
JNBridge was founded in 2001 at a time when Sun Microsystems and Microsoft were embroiled in antitrust lawsuits over the compatibility of Java on Microsoft's platforms.

The first commercially available version of JNBridgePro was released on June 3, 2002. It supported accessing Java classes from .NET. Subsequent versions added accessing .NET classes from Java, support for transactions and plug-ins for Visual Studio and Eclipse.

JNBridge released two new products in 2007, JMS (Java Message Service) adapters for BizTalk and for .NET.

In 2012 JNBridge introduced a line of software labs that demonstrate how to connect diverse technologies.

== Products ==
=== JNBridgePro - Java & .NET Interoperability ===
JNBridgePro is a Java and .NET interoperability tool that enables developers to build cross-platform applications that run in the same process or across a network, on the ground or in the cloud.

=== JNBridge JMS Adapter for .NET ===
The JNBridge JMS Adapter for .NET provides integration of JMS (Java Message Service) capabilities into Microsoft .NET applications.

=== JNBridge JMS Adapter for BizTalk Server ===
The JNBridge JMS Adapter for BizTalk Server provides integration of JMS capabilities into Microsoft BizTalk Server applications.

== Labs ==
- Integrate Java- and Mono-based microservices using Docker
- Use the Play Framework to create a Java web application on top of a .NET back-end
- Create a .NET-based Visual Monitoring System for Hadoop
- Build an Excel add-in for HBase MapReduce
- Build a LINQ provider for HBase MapReduce
- Create .NET-based MapReducers for Hadoop
- Using a Java SSH Library to Build a BizTalk Adapter

== See also ==
- Java
- .NET Framework
