= Petals ESB =

Type of computer software

- Developer: Linagora
- Stable release: 5.2.0 / October 1, 2018
- Written in: Java
- Operating system: Cross-platform
- Type: enterprise service bus
- License: LGPL 2.0
- Website: http://petals.ow2.org

Petals ESB is an open-source ESB developed by Linagora. It is a tool for implementing a service-oriented architecture (SOA). It is standard, modular, and physically distributed, to adapt to large-scale infrastructures.

Petals ESB is based on JBI (JSR 208) industry specification. It was the first ESB certified by Sun Microsystems under the JSR 208 TCK. Based on standards, it also supports SOA standards such as BPMN and Enterprise Integration Patterns capabilities.

Fractal deployment framework, JBI pluggable components, and open source licensing make it modular and customizable.

The originality of Petals is to implement a highly distributed topology. The first stable version of Petals ESB, called PEtALS, was released on September 21, 2006.

== Features ==
PEtALS main technical features :

- Scalable for large architectures, due to distributed topology
- JBI certified by Sun Microsystems
- Development tools: JBI component framework, Eclipse configuration plugin,
- Operating tools: Petals CLI, Petals Cockpit
- Quality of service: High availability (load balancing), Persistence, Security,
- Adaptable: Fractal modular framework, JBI plugins
- Connectors: SOAP (Web services), Rest, Local File, FTP/SFTP, HTTP, Quartz, JMS, SMTP/POP/IMAP, JDBC/SQL, EJB. Compatible with JBI plugins.
- Processing components : BPMN (Flowable), EIP (Apache Camel), XSLT, XSD validation, POJO/JSR181, RMI.

== See also ==
- Enterprise Integration Patterns
- Enterprise Messaging System
- Message Oriented Middleware
- Mule
- Servicemix
