= OSB =

OSB may refer to:

- Oberstabsbootsmann, German Navy rank
- Old Saybrook station in Connecticut, USA (Amtrak station code)
- OneSavings Bank plc, a UK registered bank, trade name Kent Reliance
- Operation Sovereign Borders, Australian border security operation
- Operation Smiling Buddha, India's first successful nuclear bomb test (1974)
- Oracle Service Bus, a software communication system
- Oriented strand board, an engineered wood

== Organizations ==
- Oklahoma School for the Blind
- Open Source Business Alliance, sometimes known as OSB Alliance
- Oregon State Bar, public body that regulates the legal profession in Oregon, United States
- Orlando Solar Bears, ice hockey team in Florida
- Orquestra Sinfônica Brasileira, the Portuguese name of the Brazilian Symphony Orchestra

== Christianity ==
- Order of Saint Benedict, Catholic monastic order
- Order of St Benedict (Anglican), Anglican monastic order
- Order of Saint Benedict (Orthodox), Orthodox monastic order
- Orthodox Study Bible, Eastern Orthodox Bible in English that includes the Septuagint
