= IONA Technologies =

Irish software company

IONA Technologies, Inc.
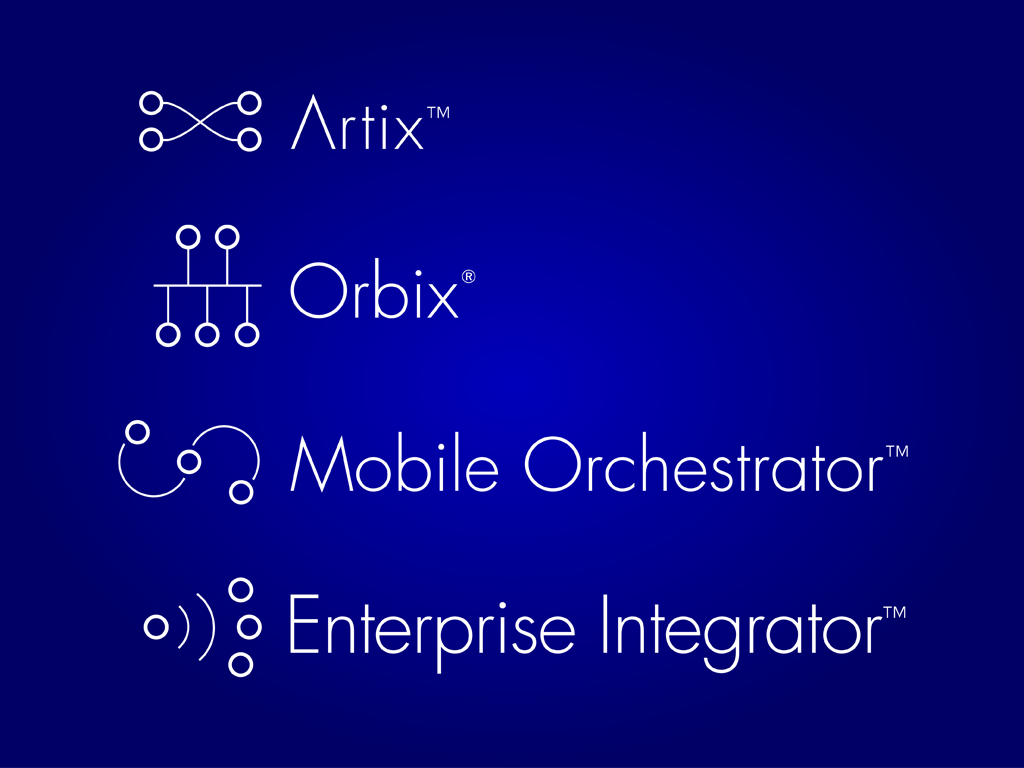
- Type: Public
- Traded as: Nasdaq: IONA
- Industry: Computer software Consulting; IT Services
- Founded: 1991; 35 years ago
- Defunct: 2008
- Fate: Acquired
- Headquarters: Dublin, Ireland
- Products: IONA Artix, Fuse ESB, Orbix, Orbacus
- Website: www.iona.com

IONA Technologies, Inc. was an Irish software company founded in 1991. It began as a campus company linked to Trinity College Dublin had its headquarters in Dublin, and eventually also expanded its offices in Boston and Tokyo. It specialised in distributed service-oriented architecture (SOA) technology, its products connecting systems and applications by creating a network of services without requiring a centralised server or creating an information technology project. IONA was the first Irish company to float on the NASDAQ exchange. It was valued at up to US$1.75 billion at its peak. It was one of the world's 10 largest software-only companies, and around 30 new ventures spun out from it. IONA was sold to Progress Software in 2008.

== History ==
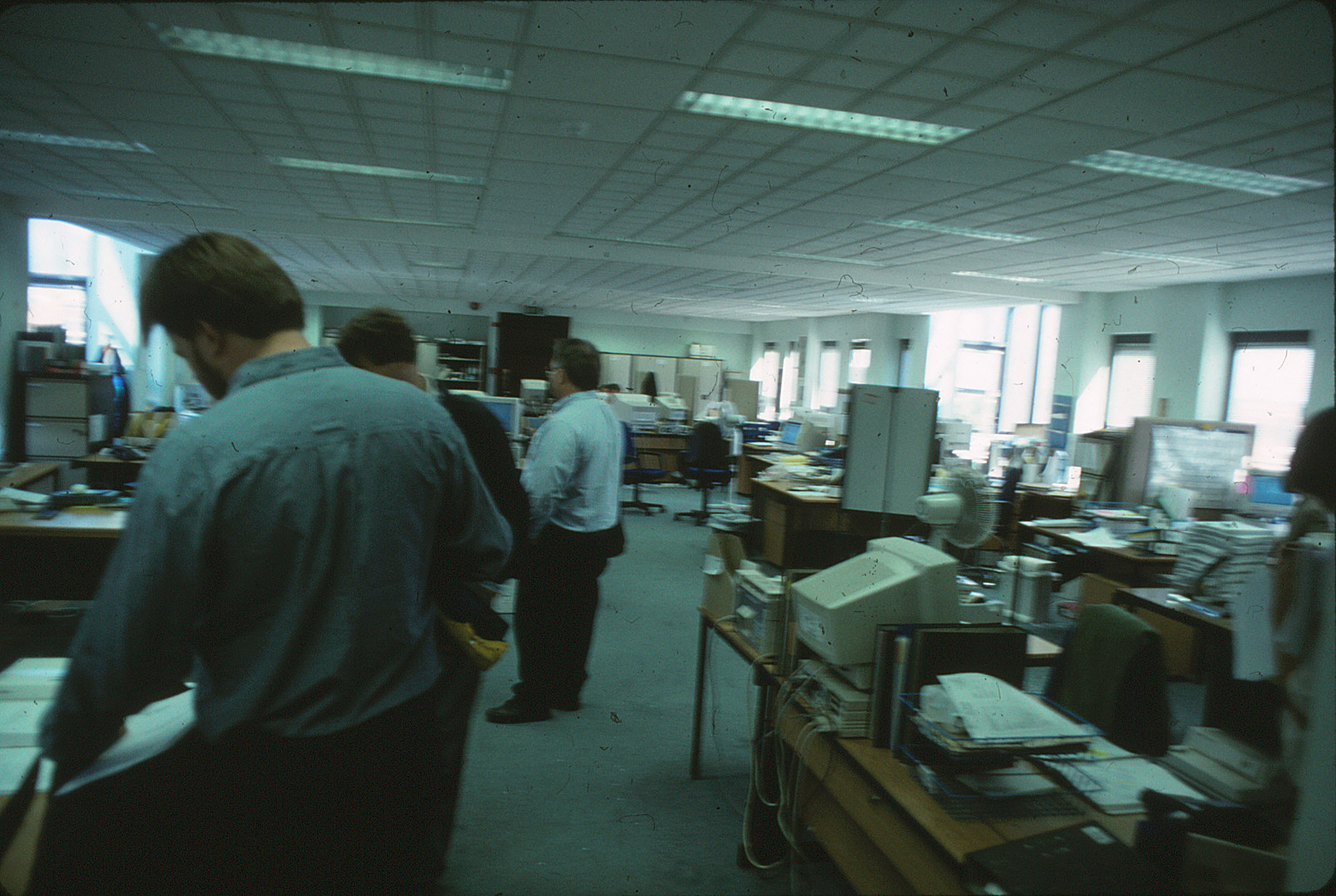
Iona Technologies headquarters on Percy Place in Dublin, 1994

In 1981, a Trinity College Dublin PhD student, Chris Horn, visited Stanford University, and met Andy Bechtolsheim, inventor of the Stanford University Network (SUN) workstation, and Bill Joy, and when they later went on to co-found Sun Microsystems, he began to talk to fellow academics about starting their own venture. Eventually, in 1991, IONA Technologies, was founded by Horn and fellow TCD academics Sean Baker and Annrai O’Toole, each of the three putting in 1,000 Irish pounds for starting capital. IONA received limited support from Trinity College, including an office with a desk and phone in TCD's O'Reilly Institute on Westland Row.

== Leadership ==
Horn was the first CEO and later also lead architect and developer for the Orbix product, launched in 1992. The firm was strategically focused on object-oriented middleware software, but initially produced training, device drivers and ran backups. IONA found the Irish market (business expansion schemes, banks, venture capital firms) unwilling to invest, secured some IDA Ireland support, grew. After showcasing their first product in the US in 1992, they secured a minority investment from Sun Microsystems in December 1993, 600,000 US dollars for 25% of the equity.

== NASDAQ ==
Despite having just 11 staff, they then sold a multi-national network management system to Motorola, and then a solution to Boeing, and were able to become the first Irish company to float on the NASDAQ, achieving the fifth largest debut on that exchange to date.

At peak the company reached a market valuation of US$1.75 billion.

Horn stepped down from the CEO role in 2000, but remained as a non-executive director; he returned to the CEO role from 2003 to 2005, after the "dotcom crash". On 25 June 2008 it was announced that IONA would be acquired by Progress Software for about $162 million, the deal closing shortly thereafter. Over its lifetime, about 30 new companies had spun out from IONA.

On 24 December 2012 Progress Software sold the IONA-related Orbix, Orbacus and Artix software product lines to Micro Focus International plc for $15 million.

=== Open-source spin-offs ===
The open-source group was later spun out into its own entity, FuseSource Corp, which was acquired by Red Hat in 2012. This group consisted of individuals and technologies involved in the various open-source projects and communities, including those that joined as part of the acquisition of LogicBlaze.

== Development standards ==
IONA was involved in the development of standards that are relevant to large-scale IT integration. IONA employed the Web service, Java, TMF and Common Object Request Broker Architecture (CORBA) families of standards in their products, and was involved in the following standards bodies:

- World Wide Web Consortium (W3C)
- Organization for the Advancement of Structured Information Standards (OASIS)
- Object Management Group (OMG)
- Telecommunications Management Forum (TMF)
- Web Services Interoperability (WS-I)
- Microsoft/IBM Web Services Workshop Process
- Open Service-Oriented Architecture's Service component architecture (SCA)
- Open Services Gateway initiative (OSGi) Alliance

== Open source ==
IONA promoted both open-source and commercially licensed software, participated in several open source initiatives, and acquired LogicBlaze. IONA was involved in the following open-source projects, and offered enterprise versions of the projects tested, certified and supported:

- Apache CXF project
- Apache ActiveMQ project
- Apache ServiceMix project
- Apache Camel project
- SOA Tooling Platform (STP) project at the Eclipse Foundation

These became part of FuseSource Corp., later within Red Hat.

== Products ==
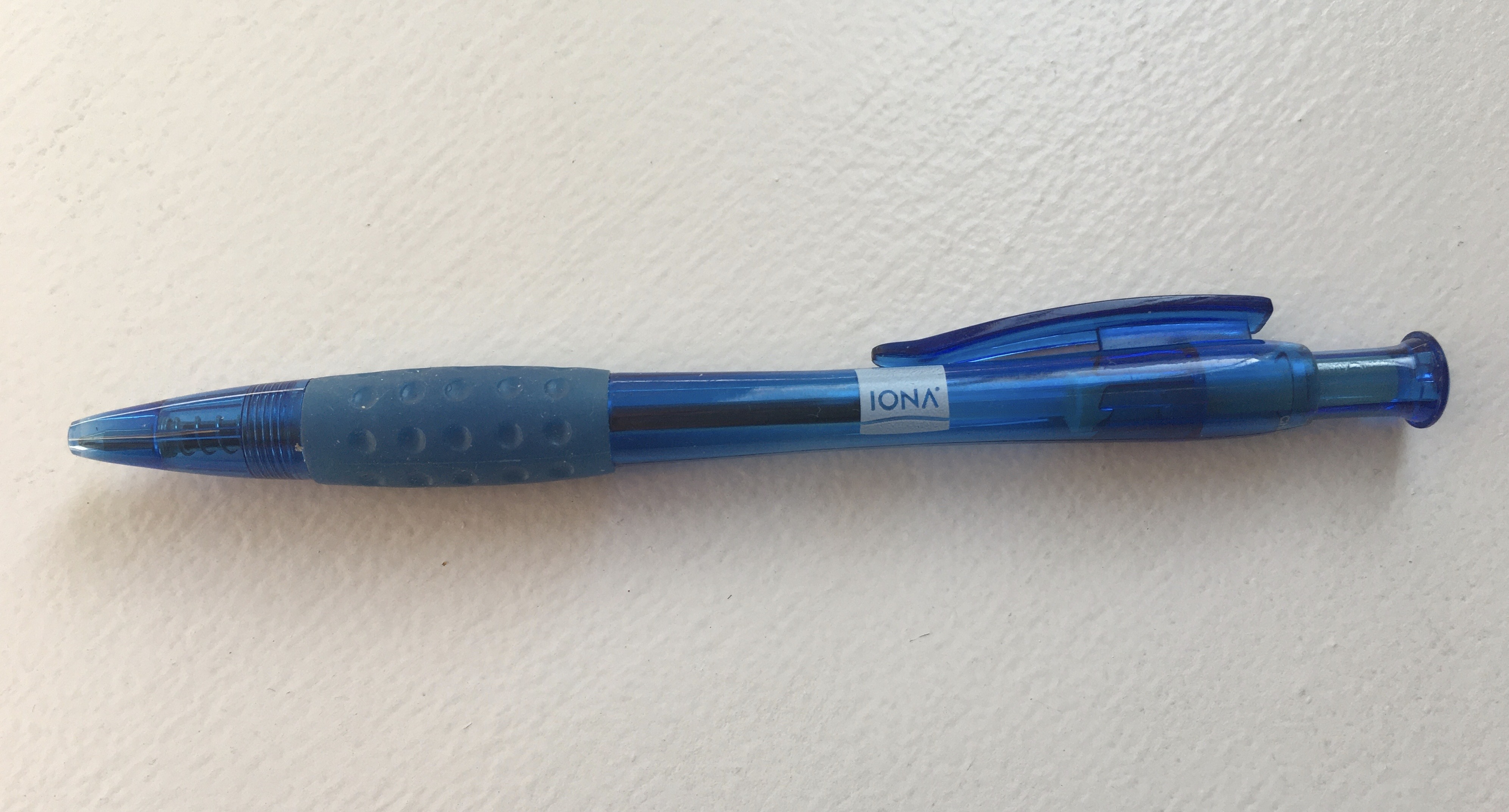
IONA promotional pen, 2001

IONA's initial integration products were built using the CORBA standard, and later products were built using Web services standards.

IONA's products include:

- IONA Artix – advanced SOA infrastructure suite. Components include:
  - Artix ESB (Enterprise Service Bus)
  - Artix Registry/Repository
  - Artix Orchestration
  - Artix Mainframe
  - Artix Connect for WCF
  - Artix Data Services (formally Century 24's Integration Objects (IO). C24 was acquired by IONA in March 2007. In April 2011 C24 Technologies Limited acquired the product and brand from Progress Software and relaunched the product as C24iO.)
- FUSE – IONA's version of open source projects that include testing and professional services. Components included:
  - FUSE ESB – commercial version of Apache ServiceMix
  - FUSE Message Broker – commercial version of Apache ActiveMQ
  - FUSE Services Framework – commercial version of Apache CXF
  - FUSE Mediation Router – commercial version of Apache Camel
- Orbix – commercial CORBA software
- Orbix DCE Security – commercial CORBA software for IT
- Orbix Names and Orbix IFr – commercial CORBA software for IT
- Orbix 3 with dynamic pluggable services, later Artix – commercial COBRA _IMP software for IT
- Orbacus – embeddable C++ CORBA ORB
- Professional services – training, consulting, and support
