= Data Format Description Language =

Modeling language for describing general text and binary data

Data Format Description Language (DFDL, often pronounced daff-o-dil) is a modeling language for describing general text and binary data in a standard way. It was published as an Open Grid Forum Recommendation in February 2021, and in April 2024 was published as an ISO standard.

A DFDL model or schema allows any text or binary data to be read (or "parsed") from its native format and to be presented as an instance of an information set. (An information set is a logical representation of the data contents, independent of the physical format. For example, two records could be in different formats, because one has fixed-length fields and the other uses delimiters, but they could contain exactly the same data, and would both be represented by the same information set). The same DFDL schema also allows data to be taken from an instance of an information set and written out (or "serialized") to its native format.

DFDL is descriptive and not prescriptive. DFDL is not a data format, nor does it impose the use of any particular data format. Instead it provides a standard way of describing many different kinds of data formats. This approach has several advantages. It allows an application author to design an appropriate data representation according to their requirements while describing it in a standard way which can be shared, enabling multiple programs to directly interchange the data.

DFDL achieves this by building upon the facilities of W3C XML Schema 1.0. A subset of XML Schema is used, enough to enable the modeling of non-XML data. The motivations for this approach are to avoid inventing a completely new schema language, and to make it easy to convert general text and binary data, via a DFDL information set, into a corresponding XML document.

Educational material is available in the form of DFDL Tutorials, videos and several hands-on DFDL labs.

== History ==
DFDL was created in response to a need for grid APIs to be able to understand data regardless of source. A language was needed capable of modeling a wide variety of existing text and binary data formats. A working group was established at the Global Grid Forum (which later became the Open Grid Forum) in 2003 to create a specification for such a language.

A decision was made early on to base the language on a subset of W3C XML Schema, using <xs:appinfo> annotations to carry the extra information necessary to describe non-XML physical representations. This is an established approach that was already being used by 2003 in commercial systems. DFDL takes this approach and evolves it into an open standard capable of describing many text or binary data formats.

Work continued on the language, resulting in the publication of a DFDL 1.0 specification as OGF Proposed Recommendation GFD.174 in January 2011.

The official OGF Recommendation is now GFD.240 published in February 2021 which obsoletes all prior versions and incorporates all issues noted to date (also available as html). A summary of DFDL and its features is available at the OGF. Any issues with the specification are being tracked using GitHub issue trackers.

In April 2024, DFDL was published as ISO/IEC 23415:2024 by way of the ISO Publicly Available Standards (PAS) process. The standard is available from ISO but will remain publicly available from the Open Grid Forum as well.

== Implementations ==
Implementations of DFDL processors that can parse and serialize data using DFDL schemas are available.

- IBM has multiple DFDL implementations.
  - a production-ready DFDL 1.0 streaming parser, modeler and visual tester. This is available in several IBM products including IBM App Connect Enterprise (formerly known as IBM Integration Bus). A free developer edition is available.
  - IBM z/TPF DFDL which is part of the IBM Mainframe z/Transaction Processing Facility.
- Apache Daffodil is an open-source DFDL processor having both parser and unparser, an IDE that is an extension of VSCode, as well as integrations into Apache NiFi, the XML Calabash XProc pipeline engine, and Smooks. It continues to be under active development.
- European Space Agency project S2G Data Viewer includes a parser DFDL4S that implements a subset of the DFDL 1.0 specification.

A public repository for DFDL schemas that describe commercial and scientific data formats has been established on GitHub. DFDL schemas for formats like UN/EDIFACT, NACHA, MIL-STD-2045, NITF, and ISO8583 are available for free download.

== Example ==
Take as an example the following text data stream which gives the name, age and location of a person:

The logical model for this data can be described by the following fragment of an XML Schema document. The order, names, types and cardinality of the fields are expressed by the XML schema model.

<xs:schema xmlns:xs="http://www.w3.org/2001/XMLSchema" ...>

<xs:complexType name="person_type">
  <xs:sequence>
    <xs:element name="name" type="xs:string"/>
    <xs:element name="age" type="xs:short"/>
    <xs:element name="county" type="xs:string"/>
    <xs:element name="country" type="xs:string"/>
  </xs:sequence>
</xs:complexType>

</xs:schema>

To additionally model the physical representation of the data stream, DFDL augments the XML schema fragment with annotations on the xs:element and xs:sequence objects, as follows:

<xs:schema xmlns:dfdl="http://www.ogf.org/dfdl/dfdl-1.0/" xmlns:xs="http://www.w3.org/2001/XMLSchema" ...>

<xs:complexType name="person_type">
  <xs:sequence>
    <xs:annotation><xs:appinfo source="http://www.ogf.org/dfdl/">
        <dfdl:sequence encoding="ASCII" sequenceKind="ordered" 
                       separator="," separatorType="infix" separatorPolicy="required"/>                   
    </xs:appinfo></xs:annotation>
    <xs:element name="name" type="xs:string">
      <xs:annotation><xs:appinfo source="http://www.ogf.org/dfdl/">
        <dfdl:element lengthKind="delimited" encoding="ASCII"/>                   
      </xs:appinfo></xs:annotation>
    </xs:element>
    <xs:element name="age" type="xs:short">
      <xs:annotation><xs:appinfo source="http://www.ogf.org/dfdl/">
        <dfdl:element representation="text" lengthKind="delimited" encoding="ASCII"
                      textNumberRep="standard" textNumberPattern="#0" textNumberBase="10"/>                   
      </xs:appinfo></xs:annotation>
    </xs:element>
    <xs:element name="county" type="xs:string">
      <xs:annotation><xs:appinfo source="http://www.ogf.org/dfdl/">
        <dfdl:element lengthKind="delimited" encoding="ASCII"/>                   
      </xs:appinfo></xs:annotation>
    </xs:element>
    <xs:element name="country" type="xs:string">
      <xs:annotation><xs:appinfo source="http://www.ogf.org/dfdl/">
        <dfdl:element lengthKind="delimited" encoding="ASCII"/>                   
      </xs:appinfo></xs:annotation>
    </xs:element>
  </xs:sequence>
</xs:complexType>

</xs:schema>

The property attributes on these DFDL annotations express that the data are represented in an ASCII text format with fields being of variable length and delimited by commas

An alternative, more compact syntax is also provided, where DFDL properties are carried as non-native attributes on the XML Schema objects themselves.

<xs:schema xmlns:dfdl="http://www.ogf.org/dfdl/dfdl-1.0/" xmlns:xs="http://www.w3.org/2001/XMLSchema" ...>

<xs:complexType name="person_type">
  <xs:sequence dfdl:encoding="ASCII" dfdl:sequenceKind="ordered" 
               dfdl:separator="," dfdl:separatorType="infix" dfdl:separatorPolicy="required">
    <xs:element name="name" type="xs:string"
                dfdl:lengthKind="delimited" dfdl:encoding="ASCII"/>                   
    <xs:element name="age" type="xs:short"
                dfdl:representation="text" dfdl:lengthKind="delimited" dfdl:encoding="ASCII"
                dfdl:textNumberRep="standard" dfdl:textNumberPattern="##0" dfdl:textNumberBase="10"/>                   
    <xs:element name="county" type="xs:string"
                dfdl:lengthKind="delimited" dfdl:encoding="ASCII"/>                   
    <xs:element name="country" type="xs:string"
                dfdl:lengthKind="delimited" dfdl:encoding="ASCII"/>                   
  </xs:sequence>
</xs:complexType>

</xs:schema>

== Features ==
The goal of DFDL is to provide a rich modeling language capable of representing any text or binary data format. The 1.0 release is a major step towards this goal. The capability includes support for:

- Text data types such as strings, numbers, zoned decimals, calendars and Booleans
- Binary data types such as two's complement integers, BCD, packed decimals, floats, calendars and Booleans
- Fixed length data and data delimited by text or binary markup
- Language data structures found in languages like COBOL, C and PL/1
- Industry standards such as CSV, SWIFT, FIX, HL7, X12, HIPAA, EDIFACT, ISO 8583
- Any encoding and endian-ness
- Bit data of arbitrary length
- Pattern languages for text numbers and calendars
- Ordered, unordered and floating content
- Default values on parsing and serializing
- Nil values capability for handling out-of-band data
- Fixed and variable arrays
- XPath 2.0 expression language including variables to model dynamic data
- Speculative parsing and other mechanisms to resolve choices and optionality
- Validation to XML Schema 1.0 rules
- A scoping mechanism that allows common property values to be applied at multiple annotation points
- Hiding elements in the data from the information set
- Calculating element values for the information set

== See also ==
- Open Grid Forum
- W3C XML Schema
