= Universal integration platform =

A universal integration platform is a development- and/or configuration-time analog of a universal server. The emphasis on the term: "platform" implies a middleware environment from which integration oriented solutions are derived. Likewise, the term: "Universal" implies depth and breadth of integration capabilities that transcend disparate operating systems, protocols, APIs, data sources, programming languages, composite processes, discrete services, and monolithic applications.

== Related Technologies ==
- Integration platform
- Enterprise service bus (ESB)
- Enterprise information integration (EII)

== Relevant Protocols ==
- WebDAV
- HTTP
- SOAP
- UDDI
- SMTP
- POP3
- IMAP
- NNTP
- m-BizMaker

== Relevant Data Access APIs ==
- ODBC
- JDBC
- ADO.NET
- OLE DB

== Typical Data Sources ==
- SQL
- XML exposed via URIs
- Free Text

== Universal Integration Platform Solutions ==
- Virtuoso Universal Server from OpenLink Software
- Prova
