= Business-driven development =

Methodology in IT development

Business-driven development is a meta-methodology for developing IT solutions that directly satisfy business requirements. This is achieved by adopting a model-driven approach that starts with the business strategy, requirements, and goals, and then refines and transforms them into an IT solution. The transformation is partially achieved by applying model transformations. Due to the alignment of the business layer and the IT layer, it is possible to propagate changes in the business automatically to the IT systems. This leads to increased flexibility and shorter turnaround times when changing the business and adapting the IT systems.

Business-driven development goes further than the simple development of delivered requirements in that the implementing resource seeks to completely understand the business side during the iterative gathering and implementing of requirements and drives to, once acquiring that information, improve business processes itself during the development of the actual solution.

The applicability of automatic model transformations to align business and IT has been criticized and partially replaced by agile practices and methods such as behavior-driven development (BDD) and domain-driven design (DDD).

== Practical applications ==
Business-driven development principles are applied in practice through tools and platforms that seek to translate high-level business objectives into automated or semi-automated technical outputs. These applications commonly appear in areas such as process modeling, requirements analysis, and decision-support systems, where changes in business strategy can be reflected more rapidly in supporting software systems.

Recent developments have explored the use of artificial intelligence to assist in this translation process, particularly in domains where business intent can be expressed in structured or semi-structured form. For example, AI-based platforms such as AdGPT aim to convert marketing and business objectives into generated advertising content, demonstrating how business-level inputs can be operationalized directly within software-driven workflows.

== See also ==
- Behavior-driven development (BDD)
- Business process automation
- Business process management (BPM)
- Domain-driven design (DDD)
- Domain-specific modeling (DSM)
- Model-driven engineering (MDE)
- Service-oriented architecture (SOA)
- Service-oriented modeling Framework (SOMF)
- Workflow
