= Medical integration environment =

Medical integration environment (MIE) are specialised tools designed to simplify the sharing of medical and related data between medical equipment and electronic health records. Technically, they are similar to an Enterprise Service Bus but with several extra features allowing for legacy systems that do not use web services messaging. Typically, they use Java Message Service; most Enterprise Application Integration systems can be modified to be used as an MIE but may lack the crucial HL7 and Arden syntax for storing medical knowledge.
