= Functoid =

Tool for applying methods to data in BizTalk

A functoid is a tool for applying methods to data via a GUI drag 'n drop interface from within the BizTalk Mapping tool.

In a typical BizTalk map, the data is copied from a source to a destination by dragging a line between the two. A functoid sits in the middle of this operation and applies its method to the incoming data so as to transform it to the requirements of the destination.

By default functoids are arranged into 9 categories based on their functions.

- String Functoids
- Mathematical Functoids
- Logical Functoids
- Date / Time Functoids
- Conversion Functoids
- Scientific Functoids
- Cumulative Functoids
- Database Functoids
- Advanced Functoids

Microsoft BizTalk Server offers the ability to create custom functoids by referencing a DLL into a BizTalk project and accessing its methods. It is also possible to use inline C# or inline XSLT to manipulate data as it is being copied from the source to the destination.

Refer: https://msdn.microsoft.com/en-us/library/ee267898(v=bts.10).aspx
