= Automation Anywhere =

Software company

- Type: Private
- Industry: Software
- Founded: 2003; 23 years ago
- Founder: Mihir Shukla, Neeti Mehta Shukla, Ankur Kothari, Rushabh Parmani
- Headquarters: San Jose, California, U.S.
- Number of locations: 15 offices
- Area served: Worldwide
- Key people: Mihir Shukla (CEO)
- Products: Robotic process automation (RPA); Agentic automation
- Number of employees: 2,800+
- Website: www.automationanywhere.com

Automation Anywhere is an American global software company that develops robotic process automation (RPA) and agentic process automation software.

Founded in 2003, the company is headquartered in San Jose, California.

== History ==
Automation Anywhere was originally founded as Tethys Solutions, LLC in San Jose, by Mihir Shukla, Neeti Mehta Shukla, Ankur Kothari and Rushabh Parmani. The company rebranded itself as Automation Anywhere, Inc. in 2010.

As of early 2021, the company reported some 2,800 client firms around the world. Customers cited in 2020 included Volkswagen, Whirlpool, and other organizations.

Between 2018 and 2019, Automation Anywhere received a total of $840 million in Series A and Series B investments at a post-money valuation of $6.9 billion. In 2018 the company announced a total of Series A investments of $550 million from General Atlantic, Goldman Sachs, NEA, World Innovation Lab, SoftBank Investment Advisers, and Workday Ventures. In late 2019, a Series B round, led by Salesforce Ventures, raised $290 million.

In 2019, the company acquired Klevops, a privately owned company based in Paris that works in the finance, banking and telecommunications industries.

In December 2021, Automation Anywhere announced it intends to acquire process discovery startup FortressIQ.

In June 2024, Automation Anywhere introduced AI agents and an "AI + Automation Enterprise System," adding agentic and generative AI capabilities to its existing automation platform to expand the range of processes that can be automated.

In November 2025, Automation Anywhere acquired Aisera, a provider of AI agents for IT service management, HR, and customer support. The acquisition broadened the company's agentic automation portfolio across enterprise service functions.

== Products ==
Automation Anywhere develops robotic process automation and agentic process automation software. The company's platform combines traditional automation with AI agents, enabling organizations to automate a broader range of enterprise workflows across functions including IT service management, HR, finance, and customer support.
