= Business process automation =

Automation of business processes

Business process automation (BPA), also known as business automation, refers to the technology-enabled automation of business processes.

== Development approaches ==
There are three main approaches to developing BPA:

1. traditional business process automation involves developing BPA software in a programming language for integrating relevant applications in the digital ecosystem to execute a given process;
2. robotic process automation uses software robots (also called agents, bots, or workers) to emulate human-computer interaction for executing a combination of processes, activities, transactions, and tasks in one or more unrelated software systems;
3. hyperautomation (also called intelligent automation (IA), intelligent process automation (IPA), integrated automation platform (IAP), and cognitive automation (CA) combines business process automation, artificial intelligence (AI), and machine learning (ML) to discover, validate, and execute organizational processes automatically with no or minimal human intervention.

== Deployment ==
BPA toolsets vary in capability. With the increasing adoption of artificial intelligence (AI), organizations are implementing AI-driven technologies that can process natural language, interpret unstructured datasets, and interact with users. These systems are designed to adapt to new types of problems with reduced reliance on human intervention.

== Business process management implementation ==
A business process management system differs from BPA. However, it is possible to implement automation based on a BPM implementation. The methods to achieve this vary, from writing custom application code to using specialist BPA tools.

== Robotic process automation ==
Robotic process automation (RPA) involves the deployment of attended or unattended software agents in an organization's environment. These software agents, or robots, are programmed to perform predefined, structured, and repetitive sets of business tasks or processes. Robotic process automation is designed to streamline workflows by delegating repetitive tasks to software agents, allowing human workers to focus on more complex and strategic activities.

BPA providers typically focus on different industry sectors, but the underlying approach is generally similar, as they aim to provide the shortest route to automation by interacting with the user interface rather than modifying the application code or the database behind it.

== Use of artificial intelligence ==
Artificial intelligence software robots are used to handle unstructured data sets (like images, texts, audios) and are often deployed after implementing robotic process automation. They can, for instance, generate an automatic transcript from a video. The combination of automation and artificial intelligence (AI) enables autonomy for robots, along with the capability to perform cognitive tasks. At this stage, robots can learn and improve processes by analyzing and adapting them.

== See also ==
- AI alignment
- Artificial intelligence detection software
- Artificial intelligence and elections
- Business-driven development
- Business Process Model and Notation
- Business process reengineering
- Business Process Execution Language (BPEL)
- Business rules engine
- Comparison of business integration software
- Job scheduler
- Real-time enterprise
- Runbook
- Synthetic intelligence
- Weak AI
