= Oracle Service Bus =

Enterprise service bus software

Oracle Service Bus (abbreviated OSB) is an enterprise service bus used by Oracle Corporation. Formerly named AquaLogic Service Bus, Oracle acquired this technology when it bought BEA Systems.

== Message Format Language ==
Message Format Language (MFL) is a BEA proprietary language describing the layout of binary data, which defines rules to transform the formatted binary data into XML data. It is a subset of XML.

MFL can be used by the Oracle Service Bus (OSB) to assist in the creation of service types as part of service-oriented architecture (SOA) implementations.
