= Macedonian Football League =

Macedonian Football League may refer to:

- Macedonian First Football League
- Macedonian Second Football League
- Macedonian Third Football League

== See also ==
- Macedonian Municipal Football Leagues
