= Spring Integration =

- Developer: Pivotal Software
- Stable release: 7.1.0 / June 10, 2026; 2 days ago
- Written in: Java
- Operating system: Cross-platform
- Platform: Java Virtual Machine
- Type: Application framework
- License: Apache License 2.0
- Website: https://projects.spring.io/spring-integration/

Spring Integration is an open source framework for enterprise application integration using the well-known Enterprise Integration Patterns. It is a lightweight framework that builds upon the core Spring framework. It is designed to enable the development of integration solutions typical of event-driven architectures and messaging-centric architectures.

Spring Integration is part of the Spring portfolio.

== See also ==
- Spring Framework
- Apache Camel - similar solution
