= Oracle SOA Suite =

Software

In computing, Oracle SOA Suite is a part of the Oracle Fusion Middleware family of software products.

== Features ==
Features include deploying, and managing SOAs. Oracle SOA Suite enables system developers to set up and manage services and to orchestrate them into composite applications and business processes. With Oracle SOA Suite's hot-pluggable components, organizations can easily extend and evolve their architectures instead of replacing existing investments.

Oracle Corporation publishes product strategy, product details and customer stories relating to the SOA Suite at https://www.oracle.com/integration/products.

As of November 2010 Oracle Corporation markets Oracle SOA Suite version 11g Release 1 Patchset 2 (11.1.1.3). As of January 2011 Oracle Corporation markets Oracle SOA Suite version 11g Release 1 Patchset 3 (11.1.1.4). As of April 2013 Oracle Corporation markets Oracle SOA Suite version 11g Release 1 Patchset 6 (11.1.1.7).

In June 2014 Oracle announced the release of SOA Suite 12c, promising "simplified cloud, mobile, on-premises, and Internet of Things (IoT) integration capabilities".

== Components ==
- Oracle BPEL Process Manager
- Oracle Service Bus (OSB)
- Oracle Event Processing
- Oracle Web Services Manager, a security and monitoring product for web services
- Oracle Business Rules, contains a JSR 94 Business rules engine
- Oracle Business Activity Monitoring
- Oracle Enterprise Service Bus (now known as the Mediator component)
- Oracle JDeveloper

NOTE: * Oracle Service Registry is commonly associated with SOA Suite installations, but is not licensed as part of SOA Suite. Typically, it is purchased as a component of the SOA Governance Suite.
