= Apache Camel =

Java integration framework

- Developer: Apache Software Foundation
- Release: June 27, 2007; 19 years ago
- Stable release: 4.18.2 LTS / 22 April 2026; 3 months ago
- Written in: Java
- Operating system: Cross-platform
- Type: Integration framework
- License: Apache License 2.0
- Website: camel.apache.org
- Repository: github.com/apache/camel

Apache Camel is an open-source integration framework for Java developed by the Apache Software Foundation. It connects applications, services, APIs, and data sources by providing over 350 pre-built connectors and implementing the Enterprise Integration Patterns (EIPs) described by Gregor Hohpe and Bobby Woolf. Developers define integration routes — describing where to read data, how to transform it, and where to send it — using domain-specific languages (DSLs) in Java, XML, or YAML.

Each connector is a pluggable component identified by a URI, giving a uniform programming model across message brokers (Kafka, JMS), REST and SOAP APIs, databases (JDBC), file protocols (FTP, SFTP), cloud services (AWS, Azure, Google Cloud), and enterprise applications such as SAP and Salesforce. Routes can also be designed visually using the open-source tools Kaoto and Apache Camel Karavan.

Camel is an embeddable library rather than a standalone server. It runs on Spring Boot, Quarkus, or standalone via its own CLI, and deploys as a standard Java application — as a JAR, a container image, or on Kubernetes.

== History ==
The Apache Camel project was created by James Strachan, who pushed the first commit — 42 files across two modules (camel-core and camel-jms) — on March 19, 2007. Version 1.0 was released on June 27, 2007. The project drew on ideas from the Enterprise Integration Patterns book and was influenced by earlier integration projects including Apache ServiceMix and Apache ActiveMQ.

In 2010, FuseSource was founded as a commercial company focused on Apache Camel, ActiveMQ, and ServiceMix. FuseSource was acquired by Progress Software in 2011 and subsequently by Red Hat in 2012. Red Hat productized Apache Camel as Red Hat Fuse (later renamed to Red Hat build of Apache Camel), providing commercial support and enterprise distribution.

Through the 2010s, the component catalog grew as new protocols and cloud services gained adoption. Components for AWS arrived in 2011, Kafka in 2014, and Spring Boot in 2014. The 2.x release line ran for over a decade (2009–2021) and produced 25 minor releases and 96 patch releases.

In 2018, the Apache Camel K subproject was created to run Camel integrations natively on Kubernetes using a dedicated operator. In 2019, Camel Quarkus was introduced to bring Camel to the Quarkus runtime with ahead-of-time compilation support.

Camel 3.0 was released on November 28, 2019 — the first major version in ten years — with a modularised core (split from one JAR into 33) and Java 11 support. A YAML DSL for defining routes as declarative configuration was added in 2021.

Camel 4.0, released on August 14, 2023, migrated the framework from javax to Jakarta EE APIs, required Java 17, and removed deprecated components to align with modern runtimes such as Quarkus and Spring Boot 3.

As of 2026, the project supports Model Context Protocol (MCP) for AI agent tool connectivity and A2A (Agent-to-Agent protocol) for inter-agent communication, positioning Camel as an integration runtime for AI agent architectures.

== Architecture ==
Apache Camel's architecture is based on the concept of routes — sequences of processing steps that move messages from a source (consumer) to a destination (producer). Routes are defined using one of several DSLs (Java, XML, YAML) and can apply Enterprise Integration Patterns such as content-based router, message filter, aggregator, splitter, and dead letter channel.

Each external system is accessed through a component, which provides a URI-based endpoint for sending or receiving messages. With over 350 components, Camel supports a wide range of protocols and APIs without requiring custom adapter code.

The core abstractions — Processor, Exchange, and Endpoint — have remained stable since the project's first commit. The central routing pattern, expressed as from("source").to("destination") in the Java DSL, has been unchanged since 2007 across four major versions.

The framework is modular — applications include only the components they need, keeping the runtime lightweight. A minimal Camel application can start in under one second when using Quarkus native compilation.

== Community and development ==
Apache Camel is one of the larger projects at the Apache Software Foundation by commit volume. The project's Git repository contains approximately 100,000 commits from over 1,500 contributors, with corporate email domains from over 450 distinct organizations appearing in the commit history. The repository on GitHub has over 6,200 stars. The Stack Overflow tag apache-camel has over 11,700 questions.

The project has published 272 GA releases to Maven Central since 2007 and has shipped 10 or more releases every year since 2011. Of the 56,000+ Java source files in the repository, 39% are test files. The project's bug tracker shows 7,070 bugs resolved out of 7,081 reported (99.8%) with a median resolution time of one day sustained over 17 of 19 years.

The project maintains multiple long-term support (LTS) release lines simultaneously and publishes migration guides for major version upgrades.

Third-party technology tracking services independently detect Apache Camel usage across thousands of companies. Enlyft reports over 8,600 companies using Apache Camel.

== Adoption ==
Apache Camel is used in production across a range of industries. Several commercial integration platforms use Camel as their underlying runtime engine, including SAP Integration Suite and Huawei Cloud ROMA.

Notable publicly documented deployments include:

- CERN uses Apache Camel and Apache ActiveMQ for the Large Hadron Collider's control, monitoring, and alarm systems, processing 190 million messages per day across 85,000 machines.
- UPS processes tens of billions of messages per day on Apache Camel, the largest known deployment by message volume.
- The US Federal Aviation Administration (FAA) uses Camel for the System Wide Information Management (SWIM) program, providing real-time aviation weather, flight, and surveillance data sharing across the National Airspace System.
- IndiGo (India's largest airline) uses Camel to integrate over 400 applications, saving ₹500 million per year in fuel costs.
- Vodafone's Global Integration Gateway migrated from IBM DataPower to Apache Camel, integrating over 100 systems at 10,000+ transactions per second.
- Tata Motors uses Camel for dealer integration across 1,000+ dealerships, increasing API-driven transactions from 20% to 95%.
- Viva Energy, Australia's largest fuel and convenience retailer, replaced its legacy ESB with Apache Camel for customer and delivery APIs across 1,000+ retail sites.

== Ecosystem ==
The Apache Camel ecosystem includes several related subprojects:

- Apache Camel Spring Boot — integration with Spring Boot
- Apache Camel Quarkus — extensions for running Camel on the Quarkus runtime with ahead-of-time compilation
- Apache Camel K — a Kubernetes operator for running Camel integrations natively on Kubernetes and OpenShift
- Apache Camel Kafka Connector — pre-built Kafka Connect connectors that expose Camel components as Kafka source and sink connectors
- Apache Camel Karavan and Kaoto — visual designers for creating and editing Camel routes

== Books ==
- Ibsen, Claus; Anstey, Jonathan (2018), Camel in Action (2nd ed.), Manning Publications, p. 912, ISBN 978-1617292934
- Cranton, Scott; Korab, Jakub (2013), Apache Camel Developer's Cookbook (1st ed.), Packt Publishing, p. 424, ISBN 978-1-78217-030-3
- Ibryam, Bilgin (2016), Camel Design Patterns (1st ed.), Leanpub, p. 111

== See also ==
- Enterprise Integration Patterns
- Enterprise service bus
- Message-oriented middleware
- Spring Integration
- MuleSoft
- Red Hat Fuse
- Model Context Protocol
