= Red Hat Fuse =

Enterprise application integration

- Developer(s): Red Hat
- Stable release: 7.8.0 / November 23, 2020; 4 years ago
- Written in: Java
- Operating system: Cross-platform
- Type: Enterprise Service Bus, SOA
- License: based on Apache License 2.0
- Website: https://developers.redhat.com/products/fuse/overview

Red Hat Fuse is an open source integration platform based on Apache Camel. It is a distributed integration platform that provides a standardized methodology, infrastructure, and tools to integrate services, microservices, and application components.

Red Hat Fuse is a distributed integration platform designed for agile integration with standalone, cloud, and Cloud-based integration deployment options so integration experts, application developers, and business users can independently develop connected solutions in the environment of their preference. The unified platform lets users collaborate, business units self-serve, and organizations ensure governance.

== Technology ==
Red Hat Fuse supports Spring Boot, OSGi and Java EE for use in enterprise IT organizations. It has a pluggable architecture that allows individuals to use their preferred software services in a traditional service-oriented architecture (SOA) or a microservices-based architecture. Fuse components may be deployed on-premises or in public/private clouds.

== Key features ==
- Hybrid deployment - use Red Hat Fuse on-prem, in public/private clouds, or as a hosted service and have all integration infrastructure work seamlessly allowing users to collaborate across the enterprise.
- Distributed infrastructure - Integrations, built from predefined Enterprise Integration Patterns (EIPs) and over 2000 connectors, are deployed on container-native infrastructure to adapt easily and scale quickly.
- Low-code interface - tooling allows developers and non-technical users to drag and drop predefined services and integration patterns so business units can self-serve and continuously innovative.

== History ==
Fuse was originally built by the company LogicBlaze, and was later acquired by IONA Technologies in 2007. IONA was acquired by Progress Software in 2008, and the open-source group was later spun out into its own entity, FuseSource Corporation.

In June 2012, Red Hat Inc. announced that it had acquired FuseSource from Progress Software. Following the acquisition, Fuse ESB was rebranded as Red Hat JBoss Fuse and became available for download at the developer website or the Red Hat customer portal. The name was then simplified to just Red Hat Fuse.

== See also ==
- Enterprise Integration Patterns
- Enterprise messaging system
- Enterprise service bus
- Message-oriented middleware
- Service-oriented architecture
- Event-driven SOA
- Microservices
