= Object request broker =

In distributed computing, an object request broker (ORB) is a concept of a middleware, which allows program calls to be made from one computer to another via a computer network, providing location transparency through remote procedure calls. ORBs promote interoperability of distributed object systems, enabling such systems to be built by piecing together objects from different vendors, while different parts communicate with each other via the ORB. Common Object Request Broker Architecture standardizes the way ORB may be implemented.

== Overview ==
ORBs assumed to handle the transformation of in-process data structures to and from the raw byte sequence, which is transmitted over the network. This is called marshalling or serialization. In addition to marshalling data, ORBs often expose many more features, such as distributed transactions, directory services or real-time scheduling. Some ORBs, such as CORBA-compliant systems, use an interface description language to describe the data that is to be transmitted on remote calls.

In object-oriented languages (e.g. Java), an ORB actually provides a framework which enables remote objects to be used over the network, in the same way as if they were local and part of the same process. On the client side, so-called stub objects are created and invoked, serving as the only part visible and used inside the client application. After the stub's methods are invoked, the client-side ORB performs the marshalling of invocation data, and forwards the request to the server-side ORB. On the server side, ORB locates the targeted object, executes the requested operation, and returns the results. Having the results available, the client's ORB performs the demarshalling and passes the results back into the invoked stub, making them available to the client application. The whole process is transparent, resulting in remote objects appearing as if they were local. Many modern ORB implementations also support features like asynchronous invocation patterns and pluggable communication protocols to enhance flexibility and performance.

== Implementations ==
- CORBA - Common Object Request Broker Architecture.
- ICE - the Internet Communications Engine
- .NET Remoting - object remoting library within Microsoft's .NET Framework
- Windows Communication Foundation (WCF)
- ORBexpress - Real-time and Enterprise ORBs by Objective Interface Systems
- Orbix - An Enterprise-level CORBA ORB originally developed by IONA Technologies
- DCOM - the Distributed Component Object Model from Microsoft
- RMI - the Remote Method Invocation Protocol from Sun Microsystems
- ORBit - an open-source CORBA ORB used as middleware for GNOME
- The ACE ORB - a CORBA implementation from the / Distributed Object Computing (DOC) Group

== See also ==
- Message broker – Computer program module
- Distributed object communication
- Distributed object – Concept in distributed computing
- D-Bus – Linux message-oriented middleware
