= XTS =

XTS is a three-letter abbreviation which may refer to:

- XEX-based tweaked-codebook mode with ciphertext stealing (XTS), a block cipher mode of operation used for full disk encryption
- Cadillac XTS, a full-sized Cadillac sedan launched in the 2013 model year
- XTS-400, a multi-level secure computer operating system
- Xochitl Torres Small, an American attorney and politician
