= System high mode =

System high mode, or simply system high, is a security mode of using an automated information system (AIS) that pertains to an environment that contains restricted data that is classified in a hierarchical scheme, such as Top Secret, Secret and Unclassified. System high pertains to the IA features of information processed, and specifically not to the strength or trustworthiness of the system.

== Overview ==
System high mode is distinguished from other modes (such as multilevel security) by its lack of need for the system to contribute to the protection or separation of unequal security classifications. In particular, this precludes use of the features of objects (e.g. content or format) produced by or exposed to an AIS operating in system high mode as criteria to securely downgrade those objects. As a result, all information in a system high AIS is treated as if it were classified at the highest security level of any data in the AIS. For example, Unclassified information can exist in a secret system high computer but it must be treated as secret, therefore it can never be shared with unclassified destinations (unless downgraded by reliable human review, which itself is risky because of lack of omniscient humans.) There is no known technology to securely declassify system high information by automated means because no reliable features of the data can be trusted after having been potentially corrupted by the system high host. When unreliable means are used (including cross-domain solutions and bypass guards) a serious risk of system exploitation via the bypass is introduced. Nevertheless, it has been done where the resulting risk is overlooked or accepted.

== Example ==
When Daniel is granted access to a computer system that uses System High mode, Daniel must have a valid security clearance for all information processed by the system and valid "need to know" for some, but not necessarily all, information processed by the system.

== See also ==
- Multilevel security
- Security modes

== Sources ==
- NCSC (1985). "Trusted Computer System Evaluation Criteria". National Computer Security Center. (a.k.a. the TCSEC or "Orange Book" or DOD 5200.28 STD).
- CISSP (2018). "Certified Information System Security Professional, Official Study Guide". 8th Edition
