= Edouard Bugnion =

Swiss software architect and businessman

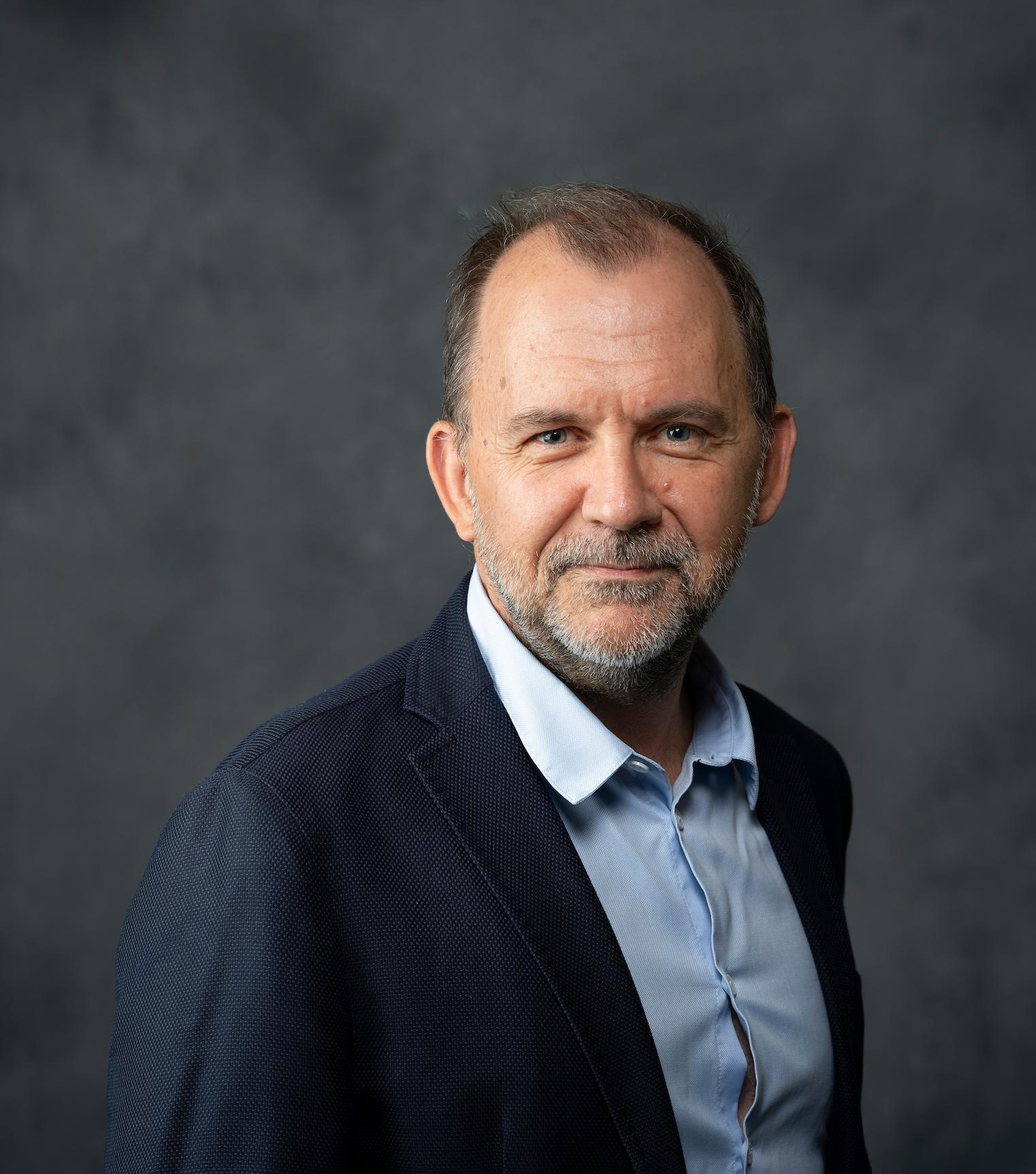
- Board member of: Logitech, Innosuisse, ICRC

Edouard "Ed" Bugnion is a Swiss computer science professor at EPFL and a co-founder of VMware. Since 2025, he is Vice President for Innovation and Impact at École Polytechnique Fédérale de Lausanne.

== Biography ==
Bugnion was raised in Neuchâtel, Switzerland.

Bugnion was one of the five founders of VMware in 1998 (with his advisor Mendel Rosenblum) and was the chief architect until 2004. While he was chief architect, VMware developed the secure desktop initiative also known as NetTop for the US National Security Agency.

After VMware, Bugnion was a founder of Nuova Systems which was funded by Cisco Systems, and acquired by them in April 2008. Bugnion joined Cisco as vice president and chief technology officer of Cisco's Server Access and Virtualization Business Unit. He promoted Cisco's Data Center 3.0 vision, and appeared in advertisements. In 2014, he became adjunct professor at the School of Computer Science at EPFL, Switzerland, where he is a Full Professor as of April 2025. He was Vice President for Information Systems from 2017 to 2020, and he was appointed Vice President for Innovation and Impact in 2025.

Bugnion’s work on operating systems and platform virtualization includes his 1997 paper, “Disco: Running Commodity Operating Systems on Scalable Multiprocessors,” co-authored with Scott Devine and Mendel Rosenblum, that won a SIGOPS Hall of Fame award in 2008; and VMware Workstation for Linux 1.0, that won an ACM Software System Award in 2009. Bugnion was elected an ACM Fellow in 2017.

Bugnion is also an angel investor in startup companies such as Cumulus Networks.
