= BlueSpace Federal =

- Industry: software
- Founded: 2006
- Headquarters: Austin, Texas
- Products: Multi-Level Security (MLS)
- Website: www.bluespace.com

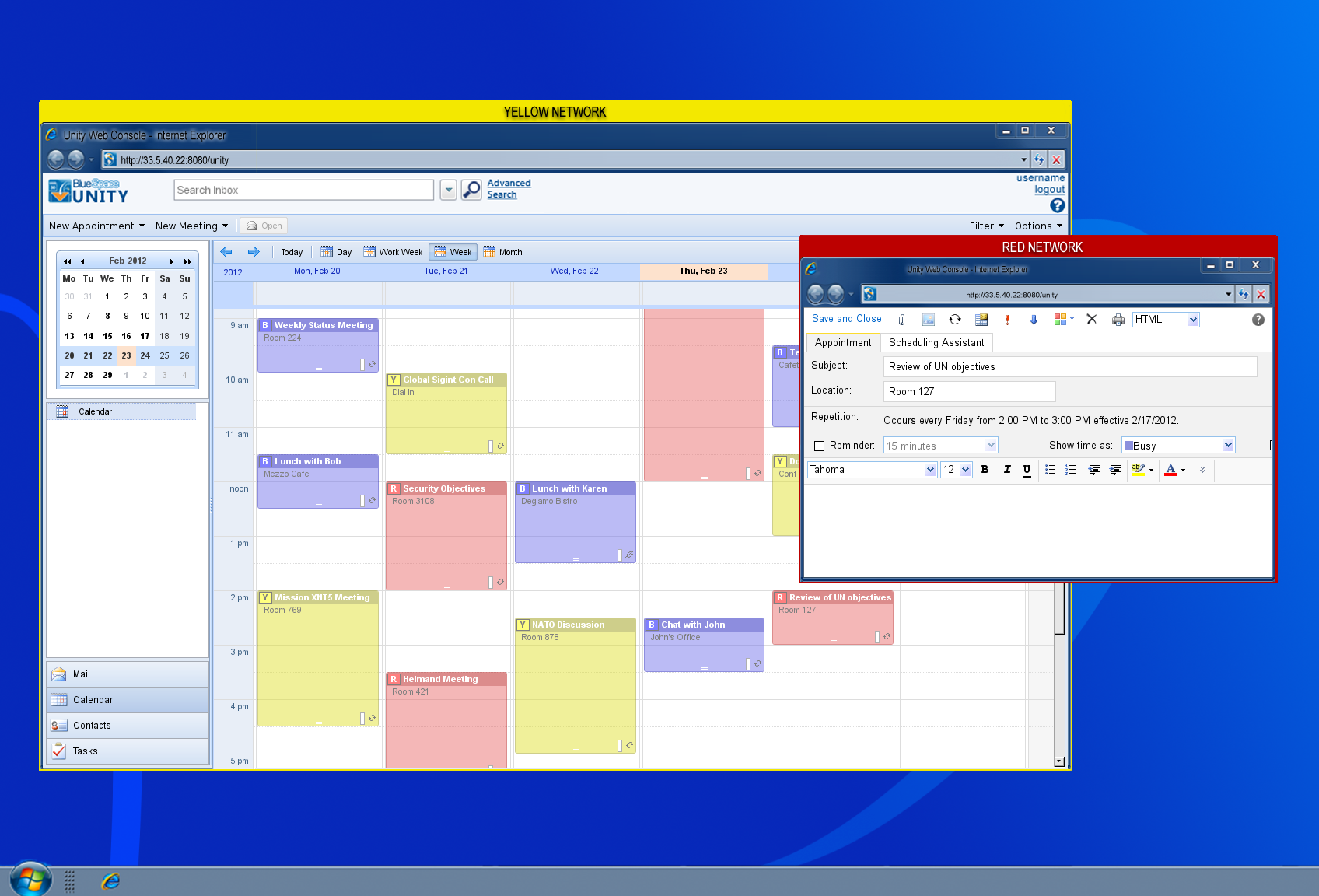
Unity Calendar

BlueSpace Federal was an enterprise software small business that served the defense and intelligence communities, primarily in the United States. BlueSpace was focused on cross-domain solutions, creating applications that can span multiple classified security domains. Specific examples of the former include a Multi-Level Security (MLS) cyber situational awareness application that integrates with SolarWinds network monitoring and management software; an MLS email client that provides a user with a single inbox and calendar connected to Microsoft Exchange; an MLS search application that connects to Google Search Appliance devices on multiple networks; and an MLS C2 application that connects to a Google Earth server and shows the operator a Unified Operating Picture that is the combination of multiple Common Operational Pictures (COPs) on different networks.

It was acquired by Sterling Computers Corporation in 2014.

== History ==
BlueSpace was founded in Austin, Texas in 2006 initially with funding from Gefinor Ventures. In June 2010, BlueSpace participated in the Coalition Warfighter Interoperability Demonstration (CWID) in partnership with the AWACS Netcentricity Program at Hanscom Air Force Base. DIA and JFCOM are also sponsoring BlueSpace's C2 technology in Empire Challenge 2010, a 'live fly' technology demonstrator based at Fort Huachuca. BlueSpace has a close partnership with the SABER PMO (formerly called DTW) at AFRL, and is embedded as part of the accredited baseline of the SABER desktop program.
