= Multilevel security =

Application of computer system

Multilevel security or multiple levels of security (MLS) is the application of a computer system to process information with incompatible classifications (i.e., at different security levels), permit access by users with different security clearances and needs-to-know, and prevent users from obtaining access to information for which they lack authorization.

There are two contexts for the use of multilevel security. One context is to refer to a system that is adequate to protect itself from subversion and has robust mechanisms to separate information domains, that is, trustworthy. Another context is to refer to an application of a computer that will require the computer to be strong enough to protect itself from subversion, and have adequate mechanisms to separate information domains, that is, a system we must trust. This distinction is important because systems that need to be trusted are not necessarily trustworthy.

== Trusted operating systems ==
An MLS operating environment often requires a highly trustworthy information processing system often built on an MLS operating system (OS), but not necessarily. Most MLS functionality can be supported by a system composed entirely from untrusted computers, although it requires multiple independent computers linked by hardware security-compliant channels (see section B.6.2 of the Trusted Network Interpretation, NCSC-TG-005). An example of hardware enforced MLS is asymmetric isolation. If one computer is being used in MLS mode, then that computer must use a trusted operating system. Because all information in an MLS environment is physically accessible by the OS, strong logical controls must exist to ensure that access to information is strictly controlled. Typically this involves mandatory access control that uses security labels, like the Bell–LaPadula model.

Customers that deploy trusted operating systems typically require that the product complete a formal computer security evaluation. The evaluation is stricter for a broader security range, which are the lowest and highest classification levels the system can process. The Trusted Computer System Evaluation Criteria (TCSEC) was the first evaluation criteria developed to assess MLS in computer systems. Under that criteria there was a clear uniform mapping between the security requirements and the breadth of the MLS security range. Historically few implementations have been certified capable of MLS processing with a security range of Unclassified through Top Secret. Among them were Honeywell's SCOMP, USAF SACDIN, NSA's Blacker, and Boeing's MLS LAN, all under TCSEC, 1980s vintage and Intel 80386-based. Currently, MLS products are evaluated under the Common Criteria. In late 2008, the first operating system (more below) was certified to a high evaluated assurance level: Evaluation Assurance Level (EAL) - EAL 6+ / High Robustness, under the auspices of a U.S. government program requiring multilevel security in a high threat environment. While this assurance level has many similarities to that of the old Orange Book A1 (such as formal methods), the functional requirements focus on fundamental isolation and information flow policies rather than higher level policies such as Bell-La Padula. Because the Common Criteria decoupled TCSEC's pairing of assurance (EAL) and functionality (Protection Profile), the clear uniform mapping between security requirements and MLS security range capability documented in CSC-STD-004-85 has largely been lost when the Common Criteria superseded the Rainbow Series.

Freely available operating systems with some features that support MLS include Linux with the Security-Enhanced Linux feature enabled and FreeBSD. Security evaluation was once thought to be a problem for these free MLS implementations for three reasons:

1. It is always very difficult to implement kernel self-protection strategy with the precision needed for MLS trust, and these examples were not designed to or certified to an MLS protection profile so they may not offer the self-protection needed to support MLS.
2. Aside from EAL levels, the Common Criteria lacks an inventory of appropriate high assurance protection profiles that specify the robustness needed to operate in MLS mode.
3. Even if (1) and (2) were met, the evaluation process is very costly and imposes special restrictions on configuration control of the evaluated software.

Notwithstanding such suppositions, Red Hat Enterprise Linux 5 was certified against LSPP, RBACPP, and CAPP at EAL4+ in June 2007. It uses Security-Enhanced Linux to implement MLS and was the first Common Criteria certification to enforce TOE security properties with Security-Enhanced Linux.

Vendor certification strategies can be misleading to laypersons. A common strategy exploits the layperson's overemphasis of EAL level with over-certification, such as certifying an EAL 3 protection profile (like CAPP) to elevated levels, like EAL 4 or EAL 5. Another is adding and certifying MLS support features (such as role-based access control protection profile (RBACPP) and labeled security protection profile (LSPP)) to a kernel that is not evaluated to an MLS-capable protection profile. Those types of features are services run on the kernel and depend on the kernel to protect them from corruption and subversion. If the kernel is not evaluated to an MLS-capable protection profile, MLS features cannot be trusted regardless of how impressive the demonstration looks. It is particularly noteworthy that CAPP is specifically not an MLS-capable profile as it specifically excludes self-protection capabilities critical for MLS.

General Dynamics offers PitBull, a trusted, MLS operating system. PitBull is currently offered only as an enhanced version of Red Hat Enterprise Linux, but earlier versions existed for Sun Microsystems Solaris, IBM AIX, and SVR4 Unix. PitBull provides a Bell LaPadula security mechanism, a Biba integrity mechanism, a privilege replacement for superuser, and many other features. PitBull has the security base for General Dynamics' Trusted Network Environment (TNE) product since 2009. TNE enables Multilevel information sharing and access for users in the Department of Defense and Intelligence communities operating a varying classification levels. It's also the foundation for the Multilevel coalition sharing environment, the Battlefield Information Collection and Exploitation Systems Extended (BICES-X).

Sun Microsystems, now Oracle Corporation, offers Solaris Trusted Extensions as an integrated feature of the commercial OSs Solaris and OpenSolaris. In addition to the controlled access protection profile (CAPP), and role-based access control (RBAC) protection profiles, Trusted Extensions have also been certified at EAL4 to the labeled security protection profile (LSPP). The security target includes both desktop and network functionality. LSPP mandates that users are not authorized to override the labeling policies enforced by the kernel and X Window System (X11 server). The evaluation does not include a covert channel analysis. Because these certifications depend on CAPP, no Common Criteria certifications suggest this product is trustworthy for MLS.

BAE Systems offers XTS-400, a commercial system that supports MLS at what the vendor claims is "high assurance". Predecessor products (including the XTS-300) were evaluated at the TCSEC B3 level, which is MLS-capable. The XTS-400 has been evaluated under the Common Criteria at EAL5+ against the CAPP and LSPP protection profiles. CAPP and LSPP are both EAL3 protection profiles that are not inherently MLS-capable, but the security target for the Common Criteria evaluation of this product contains an enriched set of security functions that provide MLS capability.

== Problem areas ==
Sanitization is a problem area for MLS systems. Systems that implement MLS restrictions, like those defined by Bell–LaPadula model, only allow sharing when it obviously does not violate security restrictions. Users with lower clearances can easily share their work with users holding higher clearances, but not vice versa. There is no efficient, reliable mechanism by which a Top Secret user can edit a Top Secret file, remove all Top Secret information, and then deliver it to users with Secret or lower clearances. In practice, MLS systems circumvent this problem via privileged functions that allow a trustworthy user to bypass the MLS mechanism and change a file's security classification. However, the technique is not reliable.

Covert channels pose another problem for MLS systems. For an MLS system to keep secrets perfectly, there must be no possible way for a Top Secret process to transmit signals of any kind to a Secret or lower process. This includes side effects such as changes in available memory or disk space, or changes in process timing. When a process exploits such a side effect to transmit data, it is exploiting a covert channel. It is extremely difficult to close all covert channels in a practical computing system, and it may be impossible in practice. The process of identifying all covert channels is a challenging one by itself. Most commercially available MLS systems do not attempt to close all covert channels, even though this makes it impractical to use them in high security applications.

Bypass is problematic when introduced as a means to treat a system high object as if it were MLS trusted. A common example is to extract data from a secret system high object to be sent to an unclassified destination, citing some property of the data as trusted evidence that it is 'really' unclassified (e.g. 'strict' format). A system high system cannot be trusted to preserve any trusted evidence, and the result is that an overt data path is opened with no logical way to securely mediate it. Bypass can be risky because, unlike narrow bandwidth covert channels that are difficult to exploit, bypass can present a large, easily exploitable overt leak in the system. Bypass often arises out of failure to use trusted operating environments to maintain continuous separation of security domains all the way back to their origin. When that origin lies outside the system boundary, it may not be possible to validate the trusted separation to the origin. In that case, the risk of bypass can be unavoidable if the flow truly is essential.

A common example of unavoidable bypass is a subject system that is required to accept secret IP packets from an untrusted source, encrypt the secret userdata and not the header and deposit the result to an untrusted network. The source lies outside the sphere of influence of the subject system. Although the source is untrusted (e.g. system high) it is being trusted as if it were MLS because it provides packets that have unclassified headers and secret plaintext userdata, an MLS data construct. Since the source is untrusted, it could be corrupt and place secrets in the unclassified packet header. The corrupted packet headers could be nonsense but it is impossible for the subject system to determine that with any reasonable reliability. The packet userdata is cryptographically well protected but the packet header can contain readable secrets. If the corrupted packets are passed to an untrusted network by the subject system they may not be routable but some cooperating corrupt process in the network could grab the packets and acknowledge them and the subject system may not detect the leak. This can be a large overt leak that is hard to detect. Viewing classified packets with unclassified headers as system high structures instead of the MLS structures they really are presents a very common but serious threat.

Most bypass is avoidable. Avoidable bypass often results when system architects design a system before correctly considering security, then attempt to apply security after the fact as add-on functions. In that situation, bypass appears to be the only (easy) way to make the system work. Some pseudo-secure schemes are proposed (and approved!) that examine the contents of the bypassed data in a vain attempt to establish that bypassed data contains no secrets. This is not possible without trusting something about the data such as its format, which is contrary to the assumption that the source is not trusted to preserve any characteristics of the source data. Assured "secure bypass" is a myth, just as a so-called High Assurance Guard (HAG) that transparently implements bypass. The risk these introduce has long been acknowledged; extant solutions are ultimately procedural, rather than technical. There is no way to know with certainty how much classified information is taken from our systems by exploitation of bypass.

== Debate: "There is no such thing as MLS" ==
Some laypersons are designing secure computing systems and drawing the conclusion that MLS does not exist. An explanation could be that there is a decline in COMPUSEC experts and the MLS term has been overloaded by two different meanings / uses. These two uses are: MLS as a processing environment vs MLS as a capability. The belief that MLS is non-existent is based on the belief that there are no products certified to operate in an MLS environment or mode and that therefore MLS as a capability does not exist. One does not imply the other. Many systems operate in an environment containing data that has unequal security levels and therefore is MLS by the Computer Security Intermediate Value Theorem (CS-IVT). The consequence of this confusion runs deeper. NSA-certified MLS operating systems, databases, and networks have existed in operational mode since the 1970s and that MLS products are continuing to be built, marketed, and deployed.

Laypersons often conclude that to admit that a system operates in an MLS environment (environment-centric meaning of MLS) is to be backed into the perceived corner of having a problem with no MLS solution (capability-centric meaning of MLS). MLS is deceptively complex and just because simple solutions are not obvious does not justify a conclusion that they do not exist. This can lead to a crippling ignorance about COMPUSEC that manifests itself as whispers that "one cannot talk about MLS," and "There's no such thing as MLS." These MLS-denial schemes change so rapidly that they cannot be addressed. Instead, it is important to clarify the distinction between MLS-environment and MLS-capable.

- MLS as a security environment or security mode: A community whose users have differing security clearances may perceive MLS as a data sharing capability: users can share information with recipients whose clearance allows receipt of that information. A system is operating in MLS Mode when it has (or could have) connectivity to a destination that is cleared to a lower security level than any of the data the MLS system contains. This is formalized in the CS-IVT. Determination of security mode of a system depends entirely on the system's security environment; the classification of data it contains, the clearance of those who can get direct or indirect access to the system or its outputs or signals, and the system's connectivity and ports to other systems. Security mode is independent of capabilities, although a system should not be operated in a mode for which it is not worthy of trust.
- MLS as a capability: Developers of products or systems intended to allow MLS data sharing tend to loosely perceive it in terms of a capability to enforce data-sharing restrictions or a security policy, like mechanisms that enforce the Bell–LaPadula model. A system is MLS-capable if it can be shown to robustly implement a security policy.

The original use of the term MLS applied to the security environment, or mode. One solution to this confusion is to retain the original definition of MLS and be specific about MLS-capable when that context is used.

== MILS architecture ==
Multiple Independent Levels of Security (MILS) is an architecture that addresses the domain separation component of MLS. Note that UCDMO (the US government lead for cross domain and multilevel systems) created a term Cross Domain Access as a category in its baseline of DoD and Intelligence Community accredited systems, and this category can be seen as essentially analogous to MILS.

Security models such as the Biba model (for integrity) and the Bell–LaPadula model (for confidentiality) allow one-way flow between certain security domains that are otherwise assumed to be isolated. MILS addresses the isolation underlying MLS without addressing the controlled interaction between the domains addressed by the above models. Trusted security-compliant channels mentioned above can link MILS domains to support more MLS functionality.

The MILS approach pursues a strategy characterized by an older term, MSL (multiple single level), that isolates each level of information within its own single-level environment (System High).

The rigid process communication and isolation offered by MILS may be more useful to ultra high reliability software applications than MLS. MILS notably does not address the hierarchical structure that is embodied by the notion of security levels. This requires the addition of specific import/export applications between domains each of which needs to be accredited appropriately. As such, MILS might be better called Multiple Independent Domains of Security (MLS emulation on MILS would require a similar set of accredited applications for the MLS applications). By declining to address out of the box interaction among levels consistent with the hierarchical relations of Bell-La Padula, MILS is (almost deceptively) simple to implement initially but needs non-trivial supplementary import/export applications to achieve the richness and flexibility expected by practical MLS applications.

Any MILS/MLS comparison should consider if the accreditation of a set of simpler export applications is more achievable than accreditation of one, more complex MLS kernel. This question depends in part on the extent of the import/export interactions that the stakeholders require. In favour of MILS is the possibility that not all the export applications will require maximal assurance.

== MSL systems ==
There is another way of solving such problems known as multiple single-level. Each security level is isolated in a separate untrusted domain. The absence of a medium of communication between the domains assures no interaction is possible. The mechanism for this isolation is usually physical separation in separate computers. This is often used to support applications or operating systems which have no possibility of supporting MLS such as Microsoft Windows.

== Applications ==
Infrastructure such as trusted operating systems are an important component of MLS systems, but in order to fulfill the criteria required under the definition of MLS by CNSSI 4009 (paraphrased at the start of this article), the system must provide a user interface that is capable of allowing a user to access and process content at multiple classification levels from one system. The UCDMO ran a track specifically focused on MLS at the NSA Information Assurance Symposium in 2009, in which it highlighted several accredited (in production) and emergent MLS systems. Note the use of MLS in SELinux.

There are several databases classified as MLS systems. Oracle has a product named Oracle Label Security (OLS) that purports to implement mandatory access controls by adding a 'label' column to each table in an Oracle database. However, these are arbitrary labels divorced from any underlying O/S enforcement mechanism. OLS is being deployed at the US Army INSCOM as the foundation of an "all-source" intelligence database spanning the JWICS and SIPRNet networks. In this case, physical measures including system-high and dedicated mode access are used to enforce mandatory access control to federal standards. Trusted Rubix is the only MLS implementation that ran atop an MLS UNIX port and could be purchased shrink-wrapped. In fact, Trusted Rubix was the only relational DBMS product available from the NSA's Authorized Security Products Information Center (ASPIC).

There are also several MLS end-user applications. The other MLS capability currently on the UCDMO baseline is called MLChat, and it is a chat server that runs on the XTS-400 operating system - it was created by the US Naval Research Laboratory. Given that content from users at different domains passes through the MLChat server, dirty-word scanning is employed to protect classified content, and there has been some debate about if this is truly an MLS system or more a form of cross-domain transfer data guard. Mandatory access controls are maintained by a combination of XTS-400 and application-specific mechanisms.

MLS applications not currently part of the UCDMO baseline include several applications from BlueSpace. BlueSpace has several MLS applications, including an MLS email client, an MLS search application and an MLS C2 system. BlueSpace uses a middleware strategy to enable its applications to be platform neutral, orchestrating one user interface across multiple Windows OS instances (virtualized or remote terminal sessions). The US Naval Research Laboratory has also implemented a multilevel web application framework called MLWeb which integrates the Ruby on Rails framework with a multilevel database based on SQLite3.

== Trends ==
Perhaps the greatest change going on in the multilevel security arena today is the convergence of MLS with virtualization. An increasing number of trusted operating systems are moving away from labeling files and processes, and are instead moving towards UNIX containers or virtual machines. Examples include zones in Solaris 10 TX, and the padded cell hypervisor in systems such as Green Hill's Integrity platform, and XenClient XT from Citrix. The High Assurance Platform from NSA as implemented in General Dynamics' Trusted Virtualization Environment (TVE) is another example - it uses SELinux at its core, and can support MLS applications that span multiple domains.

== See also ==
- Bell–LaPadula model
- Biba model, Biba Integrity Model
- Clark–Wilson model
- Discretionary access control (DAC)
- Evaluation Assurance Level (EAL)
- Graham-Denning model
- Mandatory access control (MAC)
- Multi categories security (MCS)
- Multifactor authentication
- Non-interference (security) model
- Role-based access control (RBAC)
- Security modes of operation
- System high mode
- Take-grant model
