= Black Channel =

Black Channel may mean:

- Black channel refer to the private group located in Mandibahhauddin and Lahore in Punjab, Pakistan. The group was founded in 2009 by Shahbaz Ranjha
- Der schwarze Kanal ("The Black Channel"), a series of political propaganda programmes broadcast weekly between 1960 and 1989 by East German television
- Black Channel (products), a collection of secure communications products and technologies by Objective Interface Systems, Inc.
- Black Channel (safety), a special communications channel used for safety critical communications esp. in industrial automation
