= Broker injection =

Type of vulnerability

Broker injection attack is a type of vulnerability that exploits misconfigured brokers, potentially allowing an attacker to read, write and inject information from/into their flow.

== Description ==
There are many scenarios in which a broker is used to transport the information between tasks.

One of the most typical use cases is send e-mails in background. In this scenario we'll have two actors:

- An information producer (a website, for example).
- A worker or background process who actually sends the e-mail.

The producer needs an asynchronous and non-blocking way to send the email information to the worker.

This system is usually a broker. It takes the information from the web front-end and passes it to the worker, generating a new task in the worker. So, the worker has all the information to send the e-mail.

Taking the above scenario as an example, if we could access the broker, we would be able to make the worker generate new tasks with arbitrary data, unleashing a broker injection.

== Attacks ==
With this in mind, we could make the following attacks:

- Listing remote tasks.
- Reading a remote task's contents.
- Injection of tasks into remote processes.
- Removing remote outstanding tasks.

== Origin ==
The broker injection attack is not new, but it didn't have a name. This name was coined by Daniel García (cr0hn) at the RootedCON 2016 conference in Spain.

== See also ==
- Redis
- RabbitMQ
- ZeroMQ
- Message broker
- Celery (software)
