= William Vaughan (philanthropist) =

William Vaughan (died c. May 1580) was an English landowner, farmer and philanthropist who lived in the mid-16th century in the Dartford and Erith area of north-west Kent. He was one of the yeoman to King Henry VIII and Queen Elizabeth I, but is remembered today mainly for his role in the founding of Dartford Grammar School.

== Family connections ==
Nothing seems to be known about his parentage or early years, although he had a cousin, James Vaughan who lived in Swanscombe. In his will William Vaughan left bequests to the poor of the parishes of Dartford (40/-); Stone (13/4d) and Erith (20/-); this may indicate his principal area of interest although he also held land at Tonbridge.

There seems to be no evidence of Vaughan's connection to Dartford before 1536. At that time he was said to be one of King Henry VIII's gentlemen of the wardrobe when he obtained a grant of the manor of Bignors. This manor, also known as Portbridge, had long been an asset of the Sisters of the Order of St. Augustine in the Dominican nunnery at Dartford having been given to the king by John de Bikenore of Clavering in about 1366. As the dissolution of the nunnery loomed, the sisters in 1534 leased to George Tusser of Dartford the manor with their two water-mills called the Wheat Mill and the Malt Mill. Vaughan obtained the lease of the manor (and the mills) in 1536 and had his last renewal of it between 17 November 1569 and 16 November 1570. After Vaughan's death, the lease of these mills passed to John Spilman, an early manufacturer of paper. From the details of Spilman's mill, one of the mills operated by Vaughan can be placed upstream from Dartford on the River Darenth where it meets Powdermill Lane.

In 1545 a muster of potential fighting men in Dartford included Vaughan as an able man and an archer in the company led by John Byer (or Beere), a distant relative by marriage and also a prominent local philanthropist. In 1572 he paid rent of 2/4d (Two shillings and fourpence) to the Manor of Erith.

== Marriages ==
Vaughan was married at least twice. His first known wife, Joan, was buried at Dartford on 9 September 1569. Vaughan remarried on 16 August 1571 at St Dionis Backchurch, London, to Alice Lane, formerly Wallis. It appears that Vaughan knew both her previous husbands. Alice died in 1581 and may have been buried at Erith as no record of her burial is found in the Dartford parish registers.

Vaughan had at least two children, both apparently by his first wife, Joan. A son, Charles, was born probably no later than 1544. Charles was buried at Dartford on 26 January 1570/71 Vaughan's second child, Elizabeth was born in about 1541; she married William D'Aeth (1527–1590; name also spelt 'Death'), a lawyer of Staple Inn, London, and was buried at Dartford on 13 April 1582.

== Philanthropy ==
On 20 September 1569, only a couple of weeks after the burial of his wife Joan, Vaughan executed a deed giving a newly erected house and its garden on the south side of Dartford High Street for the use of the poor in Dartford. The original deed was still at the church in 1829 but had been lost by 1933. This house was rebuilt in 1769; the garden was sold in 1871 and the house sold in 1919 for £1450. At the time of this deed Vaughan was a yeoman of the chamber to the Queen.

On 24 March 1576 Vaughan together with his son-in-law William D'Aeth and Edward Gwynn of London executed a deed conveying a house and garden on the High Street of Dartford to trustees, with the purpose of using the rent from the house to pay a master for the Grammar School. The original deed was lost between 1723 and 1829, but its substance was re-iterated in a deed of 11 January 1660. The 1576 deed is generally taken as the date of establishment of the Grammar School. Unlike deeds establishing other grammar schools at about this time, there was no provision for school premises. This appears to have been because a room above the Market House was used as a school room.

Vaughan died in 1580 and was buried at Dartford on 8 May that year. His will included the following bequests:-

"to the moste poorest people of Darteford aforeseyd clothe to the valewe of 40s to make theym cotes."

"to the pore and needy people of Stone nere Dartford 13s 4d"

"unto the poore people of Erythe 20s"

Apart from a substantial bequest of livestock to his granddaughter Johane Vaughan (daughter of his deceased son Charles) most of his assets passed to the family of his daughter, Elizabeth. A complicated arrangement compensates his second wife, Alice, for the sale of some land during their marriage that would otherwise have formed part of her dower. He mentions a sister who has not been identified “…my Syster Dethegye 40s, (yf she be lyvyng at the tyme of my decease) and to Wyllyam and Luce her chyldren to every of theym 20s. “ and his cousin "unto my cosyn James Vaughan of Swannescombe 40s". There were small bequests to several friends, a servant and "my cosyn Thomas Edwardes my best saten doublet".

The name of William Vaughan is still remembered in Dartford today in the name of one of the houses at the Grammar School.

== References. ==
Primary Sources

Will of William Vaughan of Erith, dated 4 May 1580; proved at Rochester C.C. 1580; 16.87 .13

Will of Alice Vaughan of Erith, dated September 1580; Rochester C.C. 1581–2; 16.169

Will of Charles Vaughan of Dartford dated January 1570–1, proved at Rochester C.C. 1570–1; 14.6 9

Will of William Vaughan of Dartford dated 2 February 1606–7, proved at P.C. of Canterbury 1607; Huddlestone15

Will of Thomas Wallis of Erith, dated 26 March 1561, proved at P.C. of Canterbury 1561; Loftes 33

Will of Richard Lane of Erith, dated 17 February 1565, proved at P.C. of Canterbury 1567; Stonarde 12

Parish Registers of Dartford, available online at the Medway CityArk site

Erith Manor Court Rolls (1572) "An abstract of the Rentall there renewed the xviith daye of October in the xiiiith yere of the raign of our Soveraigne ladie Queene Elizabeth", single membrane held at Bexley Local Studies Library, Bexleyheath Kent. (Ref. no. to be added).

Other References

- Dunkin, J.(1844) The History and Antiquities of Dartford with topographical notices of the neighbourhood, London, John Russell Smith. (Reprinted 1904 by J. & W. Davis, Dartford).
- Hasted, E(1798) The History and Topographical Survey of the County of Kent: Volume 2, (Reprinted 1972, Wakefield, EP Publishing Ltd/Kent County library).
- Hudson, R.L. & Patterson, D. (1997) History – Dartford Grammar School, West Malling, County Print.
- Keyes, S.K.(1933) Dartford, some historical notes, Dartford, author published.
- Keyes, S.K.(1938) Dartford, further historical notes, Dartford, author published
- Landale, J. (1829) A collection and abstract of all the material, deeds, wills, leases, and legal documents relating to the several donations and benefactions to the Church and poor of the Parish of Dartford in Kent and of the 'Spittal Alms-houses etc., etc., London, John Hearne.
- Page, W. (ed.) (1926) "Friaries: The Dominican nuns of Dartford", The Victoria County History of Kent Vol. 2, London, Victoria County History.
