= Topsy Ojo =

England international rugby union player

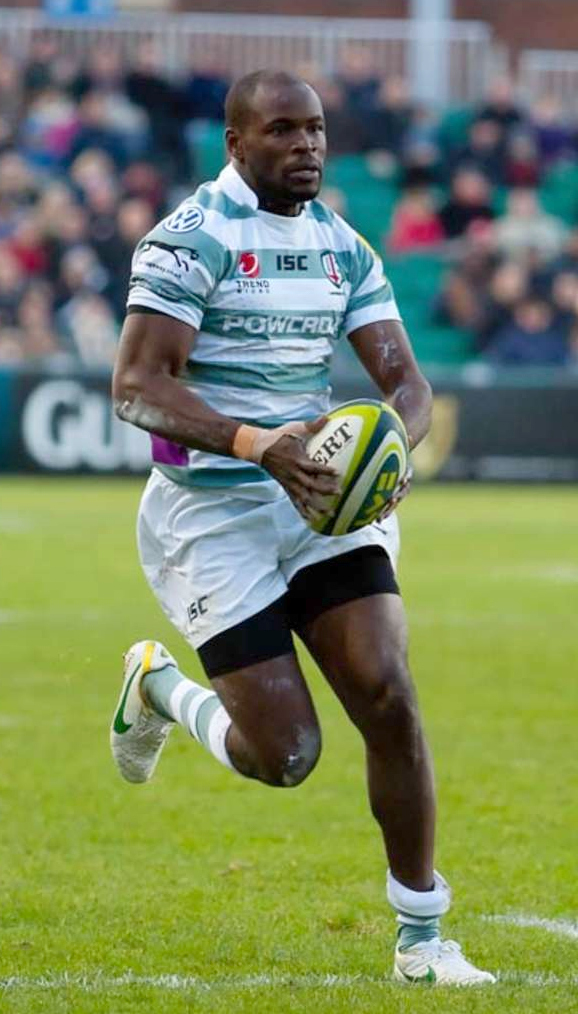
- Born: Temitope Oluwadamilola Ojo; 28 July 1985 (age 41) Tottenham, London, England
- Height: 1.83 m (6 ft 0 in)
- Weight: 89 kg (196 lb; 14 st 0 lb)
- School: Dartford Grammar School
- University: Birkbeck College

Rugby union career
- Position(s): Wing; Full-back
- Current team: London Irish
Youth career
- 2003–2005: London Irish
Senior career
Years	Team	Apps	(Points)
2005–2019	London Irish	300	(400)
International career
Years	Team	Apps	(Points)
2007	England Saxons	2	(5)
2008	England	2	(10)

Temitope "Topsy" Ojo (born 28 July 1985) is an English former rugby union player who played for London Irish and England. He is London Irish's all-time leading try scorer, with 73 tries in all competitions.

== Career ==
=== London Irish ===
Ojo was born in Tottenham, London. His father, Akin Ojo, a thoracic surgeon, and his mother Bola Ojo (née Ibidapo-Obe) are from south-west Nigeria, where Temitope is a common Yoruba name. Topsy Ojo first played rugby at Burnt Oak Junior School in Sidcup where he was selected on the wing in a 'World Cup' tournament to coincide with the 1995 World Cup. Topsy Ojo started to play 15 a-side rugby union at Dartford Grammar School at the age of eleven, going on to captain the 1st XV. He also represented Kent and London & South-East Schools at both U16 and U18. After he started playing some under-19 trial matches and being recommended for the London Irish Academy he went on to join the Sunbury based Academy in July 2003.

He made his English club debut in September 2005 in a match against London Wasps. By April 2006 he had joined the full London Irish squad playing at wing. Ojo has been tipped to replace Tom Varndell as "the hottest young finisher" by the BBC. He finished the 2005–06 Guinness Premiership season with 14 games in the starting line-up with 7 tries. That season, Ojo started in the final of the European Challenge Cup, losing to Gloucester Rugby. Ojo scored a try in London Irish's first premiership game of the 2006–07 season, in which they defeated and promoted Harlequins during the London Double Header at Twickenham. Ojo scored a try against Stade Toulousain in the 2008 Heineken Cup Semi-final.

In 2013/14, Ojo went to represent London Irish.

In 2016/17, Ojo's first season outside the Aviva Premiership, he scored a combined total of five tries in both the RFU Championship and British and Irish Cup as Irish finished top of the league. Ojo also made punditry appearances on Sky Sports during the campaign, commenting on both legs of the RFU Championship semi-final. On 4 April 2017, Topsy agreed to a new two-year deal with London Irish. The 2016/17 season also saw Ojo pass 400 points for London Irish, extending his lead as the Exiles' record try-scorer.

=== International career ===
Ojo had been a member of the England Intermediate National Academy at Bath, where he was coached by Brian Ashton. Accompanied by his colleagues, he went on to represent England at the under-19 2003 Six Nations, as well as the FIRA World Cup Championships. He also went on to represent England at the 2006 IRB U21 World Championship.

Ojo made his debut for the England Saxons against the USA in the 2007 Churchill Cup, where he scored the Saxons' first try. On 29 May 2007, Ojo was called up to the full England squad for the first time. Ojo made another appearance for the England Saxons, against Italy A in Ragusa, Sicily on 9 February 2008.

On 13 May 2008, Ojo was named in Martin Johnson's first England squad selection, set to tour New Zealand that summer. He won his first cap on 14 June scoring two tries on his debut After playing the second test, Ojo was not selected to play for England during the rest of his career.

=== Controversy during 2008 tour to New Zealand ===
Following the 2008 summer tour to New Zealand, Ojo was fined £500 by the RFU for misconduct after staying out all night following the first test.
