= Denis Haydon =

Denis Arthur Haydon FRS (21 February 1930 – 29 November 1988) was a professor of Membrane Biophysics at the University of Cambridge from 1980.

He was educated at Dartford Grammar School and King's College London (BSc; PhD).

He was made a Fellow of the Royal Society in 1975. He was also a Fellow of Trinity Hall, Cambridge where he was Vice-Master from 1978 to 1982.
