= Mobile virtualization =

Mobile virtualization is hardware virtualization on a mobile phone or connected wireless device. It enables multiple operating systems or virtual machines to run simultaneously on a mobile phone or connected wireless device. It uses a hypervisor to create secure separation between the underlying hardware and the software that runs on top of it; this can be considered a form of an embedded hypervisor, or a close analogue. Virtualization technology has been used widely for many years in other fields such as data servers (storage virtualization) and personal computers (desktop virtualization).

== Applications ==
=== Low cost platform ===
In 2008, the mobile industry became interested in using the benefits of virtualization technology for cell phones and other devices like tablets, netbooks and machine-to-machine (M2M) modules. With mobile virtualization, mobile devices can be manufactured more cheaply through the re-use of software and hardware, which shortens development time. One such example is using mobile virtualization to create low-cost Android smartphones without a separate baseband processor by running the applications and the baseband processor code in separate virtual machines on a single processor. Semiconductor vendors such as ST-Ericsson have adopted mobile virtualization as part of their low-cost Android platform strategy.

=== Enterprise ===
Another use case for mobile virtualization is in the enterprise market. Today, many consumers carry two mobile phones: one for business use and another for personal use. With mobile virtualization, mobile phones can support multiple domains/operating systems on the same hardware, so that the enterprise IT department can securely manage one domain (in a virtual machine), and the mobile operator can separately manage the other domain (in a virtual machine).

In September 2010, ARM announced that it would support a virtualization extension in its ARM Cortex-A15 processor.

== Platforms ==
Every mobile platform does virtualization differently.

=== Android ===
In Android there are many ways to do virtualization, however due to limitations and operating system security restrictions some types of virtualization software will not be able to do all the tasks or run all types of applications.

== See also ==
- Embedded hypervisor
