= Partitioning Communication System =

Computer security architecture

Partitioning Communication System is a computer and communications security architecture based on an information flow separation policy. The PCS extends the four foundational security policies of a MILS (Multiple Independent Levels of Security) software architecture to the network:

- End-to-end Information Flow
- End-to-end Data Isolation
- End-to-end Periods Processing
- End-to-end Damage Limitation

The PCS leverages software separation to enable application layer entities to enforce, manage, and control application layer security policies in such a manner that the application layer security policies are:

- Non-bypassable
- Evaluatable
- Always-invoked
- Tamper-proof

The result is a communications architecture that allows a software separation kernel and the PCS to share responsibility of security with the application.

The PCS was invented by OIS. OIS collaborated extensively on the requirements for the PCS with:

- National Security Agency
- Air Force Research Laboratory
- University of Idaho
- Lockheed Martin
- Boeing
- Rockwell Collins
