= Dartford Grammar School =

Location
- Shepherds Lane; West Hill; Dartford, Kent, DA1 2HW; England; 51°26′43″N 0°12′20″E

Information
- Type: Grammar school; academy
- Motto: Ora et Labora (Pray and Work)
- Founded: 1576; 450 years ago
- Founders: Edward Gwyn, William Vaughan, William D'Aeth
- Specialist: Language; Science
- Department for Education URN: 136359 Tables
- Ofsted: Reports
- Headteacher: Julian Metcalf
- Staff: >100
- Gender: Boys from year 7–11, Co-ed in Sixth Form
- Age: 11 to 18
- Enrolment: 1,203
- Houses: Gwyn , D'Aeth , Havelock , Vaughan , Wilson , Gemili
- Colours: Gold and maroon
- Song: Floreat Dartfordia
- Publication: DGSChapter dgschapter.com
- Alumni: Old Dartfordians
- Website: dartfordgrammarschool.org.uk

Dartford Grammar School is a secondary foundation school for boys (ages 11–18) in Dartford, Kent, England, which admits girls to its sixth form (ages 16–18). All of the students joining the school are considered to be from the top 25% of the ability range, as determined by the 11-Plus examinations. The students come from Dartford, neighbouring towns and villages, and nearby London boroughs, as well as an increasing number of students from Essex. The current roll is 1,203, including 461 in the sixth form. It is the brother school of Dartford Grammar School for Girls.

== History ==
The school was founded in 1576 by Edward Gwyn, a merchant; William Vaughan, a philanthropist and landowner; and William D'Aeth.

A 1660 document outlined the original terms for the founding of the school:

"William Vaughan, Edward Gwyn and William D'Aeth donated land and property near the Market House in Dartford High Street, the profits from which were to be used for maintaining a school and for and towards the supporting of one honest sufficient and learned man in grammar, as to them should seem fit and convenient, to be elected, chosen, and approved of, for the teaching, instructing and eruditing of children in the town of Dartford, in the knowledge of grammar, as heretofore has been used according to the charitable and pious interests and meaning of the said William Vaughan, Edward Gwyn and William D'Aeth re: 24th March 18 Elizabeth I."

Lessons were initially given in the High Street above the Corn Market house, which was demolished in 1769. The school moved to its present location in 1864.

Following the school's 'Outstanding' Ofsted inspection in 2008, the school was able to choose a third specialism, following Language College Status and the IB Programme; the school chose Science, resulting in an increased budget available next financial year. In 2011, the school chose to adopt the status of an academy, which would provide extra funding to the school, although no name change was required.

At the beginning of the 2025–26 academic year, the school established a 6th house, called Gemili House, named after Old Dartfordian Adam Gemili, after a consultation with staff, students, and alumni. Gemili House has an orange colour to represent it on the school crest.

== Academic performance ==
In 2014, 64% of Year 11 students gained 7 or more grades A/A* in GCSE exams. The school came second in the School Rankings for the new English Bacc in 2010.

In 2007, the school was awarded the right to teach the International Baccalaureate Middle Years Programme, becoming the first school in Britain and the first state school in the world to teach the course.

In 2019, the school achieved the top IB results in the country for the second time.

The school was rated "Outstanding" in its last Ofsted inspection in 2022 and will not be inspected again unless concerns are raised about its performance in an interim assessment.

== Locations and buildings ==
The school currently is located on Shepherds Lane, Dartford at the top of West Hill. The original 1864 school house (facing Dartford Road) is now known as the Hardy Building, named after the novelist Thomas Hardy who was an assistant architect to Arthur Blomfield, the architect who designed the building. The original field has since been built on with additional blocks, starting with the science block in 1928, since renamed the Stephenson building after the former head of Science, Brian Stephenson, followed by most of the remaining buildings in 1940. A three-floored classroom building is named after Major Harold Pochin, Headmaster from 1920 to 1946.

Other buildings include the Gwyn building, named after Edward Gwyn, one of the school founders, containing technology and business teaching rooms, as well as the Kaika (Sixth Form) centre, where five new teaching rooms were opened in 2008, mainly for sixth form use, named the John Field Suite after the late chair of the governors. The Beckets Sports Centre is shared with the public in agreement with the school, in the same way as The Mick Jagger Centre, a £2.2 million development financed with National Lottery funding by the Arts Council of England. The Mick Jagger Centre was opened in March 2000 by The Duke of Kent, and hosts a number of performing arts events. From Summer 2009 to Spring 2010, the Mick Jagger Centre and part of the Pochin and Stephenson blocks underwent a major redevelopment, which provided a new drama studio, new science laboratories, a food technology lab, a new staff room, new art rooms and classrooms. In 2014 to 2015, the Mick Jagger Centre was redeveloped to include several new classrooms and new music practice rooms. From 2017 to 2018, the school expanded their sixth-form centre with two new computer rooms and a quiet study area.

== Notable alumni ==
Former pupils of the school are known as Old Dartfordians.

- Henry Havelock (1795–1857), general
- William James Erasmus Wilson (1809–84), surgeon
- Henry Ambrose Hunt (1866–1946), meteorologist
- Thomas Pullinger (1867–1945), automotive engineer
- Alec Stock (1917–2001), footballer
- Sidney Keyes (1922–43), poet
- Derek Ufton (1928–2021), Charlton Athletic, England footballer, Kent CCC
- Denis Haydon (1930–1988), membrane biophysicist
- Terence Frisby (born 1932), playwright and novelist
- Dave Godin (1936–2004), music journalist
- Michael Pearson (1936–2017), clock historian and author
- Graham Smith (born 1938), milliner
- Mick Jagger (born 1943), rock musician (vocalist of The Rolling Stones)
- Dick Taylor (born 1943), guitarist and founder member, The Pretty Things
- Brian Pendleton (1944–2001), rhythm guitarist, The Pretty Things
- John Rushby, computer scientist
- Bill Mitchell (1951–2017), founder of site-specific theatre company Wildworks
- Charlie Whiting (1952–2019), Formula One race director
- Frank Baker (born 1961), British ambassador
- Gareth Johnson (born 1969), Conservative MP for Dartford
- Min Patel (born 1970), international cricketer
- Matt Morgan (born 1977), comedian
- Topsy Ojo (born 1985), rugby player, London Irish fullback
- Vinay Patel (born 1986), screenwriter
- Thomas Frake (born 1988), winner of the MasterChef 2020 UK TV show competition
- Adam Gemili (born 1993), athlete
- Semi Ajayi (born 1993), professional footballer
- Daniel Kanu (born 2004), professional footballer for Charlton Athletic and the Sierra Leone National team
