= Michael Pearson (horologist) =

British expert on clocks and clockmaking

Michael Pearson (1936–2017) was an acknowledged expert on Kent clocks and clock-making. He was born in Kent, England and educated at Dartford Grammar School. He served National Service with the Intelligence Corps, following which he returned to the private sector, working in sales, marketing and advertising. During this period he became a keen collector of antiques (an established family business), in particular clocks and early oak furniture. His family had been a notable family antique and antiquarian book dealing business in Covent Garden since 1860, and then in Pall Mall until 1929. Pearson resurrected the old family business, moving it to Canterbury, Kent, where he specialised in antique furniture and clocks.

His first horological book, The Beauty of Clocks, was published in 1979, and he was a respected authority on the history of clocks and clockmaking in Britain. His book Kent Clocks and Clockmakers was published in 1997 by Derbyshire-based Mayfield Books. He was engaged in collaboration with Bill Bruce (the well-known clock dealer in Lewes), writing a book on Sussex clocks & Clockmakers.

He died in March 2017 following a short illness.
