= Temitope =

Common Yoruba name

- Pronunciation: Tay mi top eh
- Gender: unisex
- Language: Yoruba

Origin
- Origin: yoruba
- Meaning: Mine is worthy of thanks or gratitude
- Region of origin: Nigeria

Other names
- Variant forms: Temi; Tope
- Related names: Tiwatope

listen

Temitope is a common name of Yoruba origin meaning "Mine is worthy of thanks or gratitude." A related name; Tiwatope means "Ours is worthy of thanks or gratitude." It is mostly a name given by parents to express gratitude sometimes to things that might have surrounded the birth of the child. It is a unisex name.

The name is rarely used as surname but it is common as first name or middle name.

== Notable people with the names include ==
- Temitope Ojo, British rugby player
- Temitope Fagbenle, British basketball player
- Temitope Tedela, Nigerian actor
- Temitope Joshua, Nigerian clergy
- Amina Temitope Ajayi, American businesswoman
- Oluwabusayo Temitope Folarin, American writer
- Unoaku Temitope Anyadike, Nigerian model
- Temitope Akinnagbe, American actor
- Tope Obadeyi, English footballer
- Tiwatope Savage, Nigerian actress and singer
