= ORBexpress =

Object request broker developed by Objective Interface Systems

- Developer: Objective Interface Systems
- Release: August 1998; 28 years ago
- Written in: Ada, C++, C#, Java
- Operating system: Android, Integrity, HP-UX, IBM AIX, Linux, LynxOS, MacOS, Nucleus RTOS, MontaVista Linux, Oracle Solaris, QNX Neutrino, ELinOS, ThreadX, TimeSys RT, RTLinux, VxWorks, Windows
- Platform: IA-32, x86-64, ARM, ColdFire, MIPS, PowerPC/Power ISA, SPARC
- Type: ORB
- License: COTS
- Website: ois.com/Products/communications-middleware.html

OIS ORBexpress is a commercial, object request broker (ORB) product from Objective Interface Systems for the Ada, C++, C#, and Java programming languages.

ORBexpress features tools for developing and debugging distributed, real-time applications.
