= PikeOS =

Real-time operating system

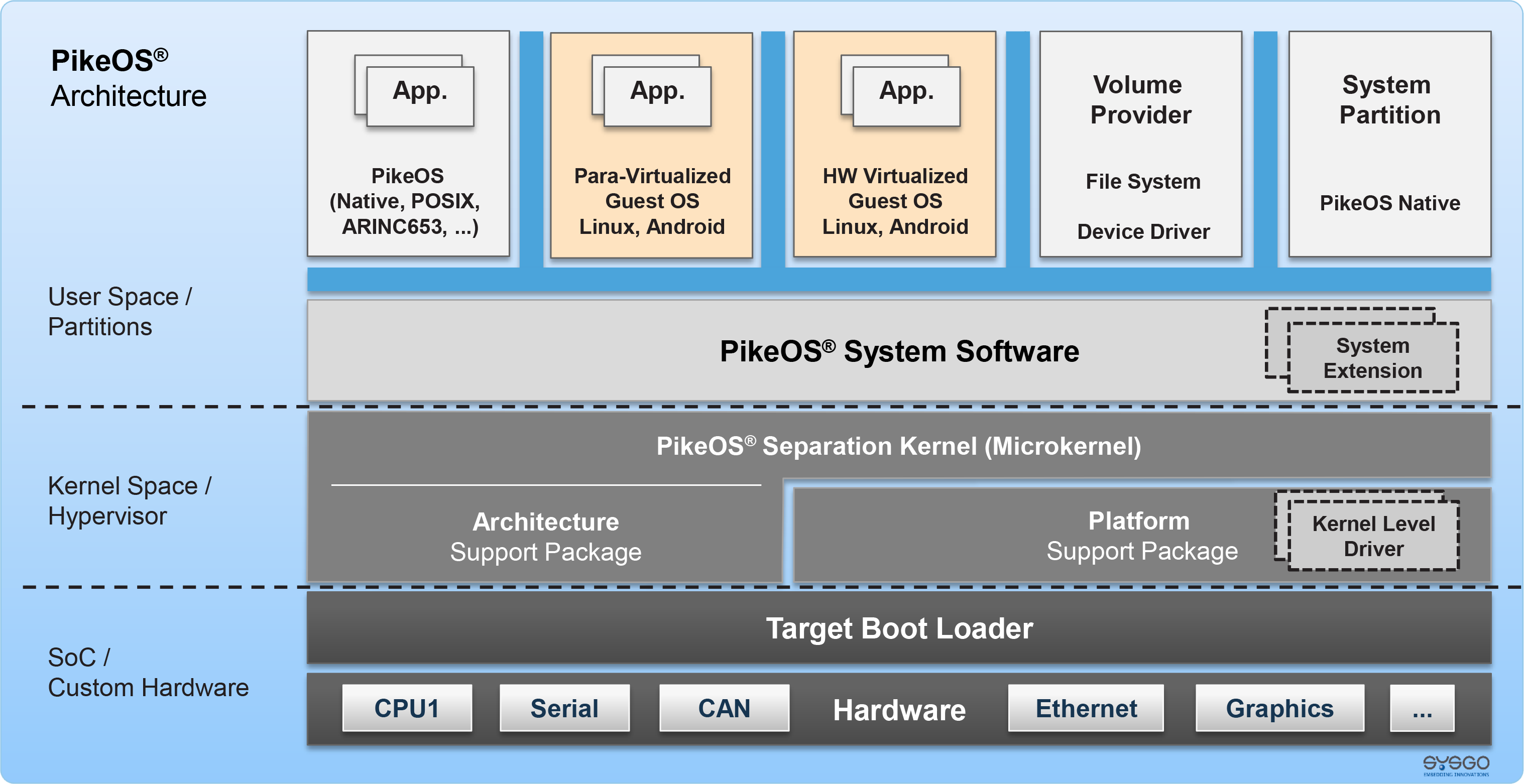
- Architecture of SYSGO's PikeOS
- Developer: SYSGO GmbH
- OS family: L4
- Working state: Current
- Source model: Closed source
- Latest release: 5.1 / January 2021; 5 years ago
- Marketing target: Embedded systems
- Available in: English
- Supported platforms: ARM, PowerPC, RISC-V, x86, x86-64, SPARC
- Kernel type: Microkernel, real-time
- License: Proprietary
- Official website: www.sysgo.com/pikeos

PikeOS is a commercial hard real-time operating system (RTOS) which has a separation kernel-based hypervisor that supports multiple logical partition types for various operating systems (OS) and applications, each referred to as a GuestOS. PikeOS is engineered to support the creation of certifiable smart devices for the Internet of Things (IoT). In instances where memory management units (MMU) are not present but memory protection units (MPU) are available on controller-based systems, PikeOS for MPU is designed for critical real-time applications and provides up-to-standard safety and security.

== Overview ==
PikeOS was introduced in 2005 and combines a real-time operating system (RTOS) with a virtualization platform and Eclipse-based integrated development environment (IDE) for embedded system (embedded systems). It is a commercial clone of the L4 microkernel family. PikeOS has been developed for safety and security-critical applications with certification needs in the fields of aerospace, defense, automotive, transport, industrial automation, medical, network infrastructures, and consumer electronics. The PikeOS separation kernel (v5.1.3) is certified against Common Criteria at EAL5+.

One of the key features of PikeOS is its ability to execute applications with different safety and security levels concurrently on the same computing platform. This is done by strict spatial and temporal segregation of these applications via software partitions. A software partition can be seen as a container with pre-allocated privileges that can have access to memory, central processing unit (CPU) time, input/output (I/O), and a predefined list of OS services. With PikeOS, the term application refers to an executable linked against the PikeOS application programming interface (API) library and running as a process inside a partition. The nature of the PikeOS application programming interface (API) allows applications to range from simple control loops up to full paravirtualized guest operating systems like Linux or hardware virtualized guests.
