= Security modes =

Generally, security modes refer to information systems security modes of operations used in mandatory access control (MAC) systems. Often, these systems contain information at various levels of security classification. The mode of operation is determined by:

- The type of users who will be directly or indirectly accessing the system.
- The type of data, including classification levels, compartments, and categories, that are processed on the system.
- The type of levels of users, their need to know, and formal access approvals that the users will have.

== Dedicated security mode ==
In this mode of operation, all users must have:

- Signed NDA for ALL information on the system.
- Proper clearance for ALL information on the system.
- Formal access approval for ALL information on the system.
- A valid need to know for ALL information on the system.

All users can access ALL data.

== System high security mode ==
In system high mode of operation, all users must have:

- Signed NDA for ALL information on the system.
- Proper clearance for ALL information on the system.
- Formal access approval for ALL information on the system.
- A valid need to know for SOME information on the system.

All users can access SOME data, based on their need to know.

== Compartmented security mode ==
In this mode of operation, all users must have:

- Signed NDA for ALL information on the system.
- Proper clearance for ALL information on the system.
- Formal access approval for SOME information they will access on the system.
- A valid need to know for SOME information on the system.

All users can access SOME data, based on their need to know and formal access approval.

== Multilevel security mode ==
In multilevel security mode of operation (also called Controlled Security Mode), all users must have:

- Signed NDA for ALL information on the system.
- Proper clearance for SOME information on the system.
- Formal access approval for SOME information on the system.
- A valid need to know for SOME information on the system.

All users can access SOME data, based on their need to know, clearance and formal access approval

== Summary ==
	Signed NDA for	Proper clearance for	Formal access approval for	A valid need to know for
Dedicated security mode	ALL information on the system.	ALL information on the system.	ALL information on the system.	ALL information on the system.
System high security mode	ALL information on the system	ALL information on the system	ALL information on the system	SOME information on the system
Compartmented security mode	ALL information on the system	ALL information on the system	SOME information on the system	SOME information on the system
Multilevel security mode	ALL information on the system	SOME information on the system	SOME information on the system	SOME information on the system

== See also ==
- Access control
- Multifactor authentication
- Bell–LaPadula model
- Biba model
- Clark-Wilson model
- Discretionary access control (DAC)
- Graham-Denning model
- Multilevel security (MLS)
- Mandatory access control (MAC)
- Security
- Security engineering
- Take-grant model
