= NetTop =

National Security Agency project

NetTop is an NSA project to run Multiple Single-Level systems with a Security-Enhanced Linux host running VMware with Windows as a guest operating system.

NetTop has U.S. patent 6,922,774.
