= Semantic overload =

Concept in linguistics

In linguistics, semantic overload occurs when a word or phrase has more than one meaning, and is used in ways that convey meaning based on its divergent constituent concepts, specifically where this divergence in meanings is novel, or becomes problematic. Semantic overload is related to the linguistic concept of polysemy. Meanings associated with a semantically overloaded word have different qualities: those the word itself refers directly to, and other meanings inferred from its use in context.

An example of this is the Basque word herri which can be translated as nation; country, land; people, population; and town, village, settlement, amongst other things leading to difficulties in translating the indigenous term Euskal Herria. Another example is the term memory, especially as used in scholarship.

Expletives are also notable for this quality, and conversely this quality is also a contributor to why such terms may be regarded as crude or inappropriate.

Overloading is related to the psychological concept of information overload, and the computer science concept of operator overloading. A term that is semantically overloaded is a kind of "overloaded expression" in language that causes a certain small degree of "information overload" in the receiving audience.

== Language planning ==
Minority languages that spread into new domains frequently suffer from semantic overloading by attempting to adapt existing terms to cover new concepts. One such example from Scottish Gaelic is the over-use of the word comhairle (originally "advice, counsel") for concepts such as committee, council, and consultation as exemplified by Donald MacAulay in dh'iarr a' chomhairle comhairle air a’ chomhairle chomhairleachaidh: "The committee sought advice from the consultative council"—a sentence that is opaque in meaning.
