= John Rushby =

British computer scientist

- Born: 1949 (age 76–77); London, England
- Citizenship: British
- Education: Newcastle University
- Scientific career
- Fields: Formal methods and dependable systems
- Workplaces: Manchester University; Newcastle University; SRI International

John Rushby (born 1949) is a British computer scientist now based in the United States and working for SRI International. He previously taught and did research for Manchester University and later Newcastle University.

== Early life and education ==
John Rushby was born and brought up in London, where he attended Dartford Grammar School. He studied at Newcastle University in the United Kingdom, gaining his computer science BSc there in 1971 and his PhD in 1977.

== Career ==
From 1974 to 1975, he was a lecturer in the Computer Science Department at Manchester University. From 1979 to 1982, he was a research associate in the Department of Computing Science at the Newcastle University.

Rushby joined SRI International in Menlo Park, California in 1983. Currently he is Program Director for Formal Methods and Dependable Systems in the Computer Science Laboratory at SRI. He developed the Prototype Verification System, which is a theorem prover.

== Awards and memberships ==
Rushby was the recipient of the 2011 Harlan D. Mills Award from the IEEE Computer Society.
