= LynxOS =

Real-time operating system

LynxOS RTOS
- Developer: Lynx Software Technologies, Inc.
- Written in: Ada, C, C++, Rust
- OS family: real-time operating system
- Working state: Current
- Source model: Closed source
- Initial release: 1986; 40 years ago
- Latest release: 7.1 / February 20, 2020; 6 years ago
- Marketing target: Embedded systems
- Available in: English
- Supported platforms: Motorola 68010, Intel 80386, ARM architecture, PowerPC
- Kernel type: Monolithic, dynamic extendable
- Default user interface: Command line interface
- License: Proprietary
- Official website: www.lynx.com/products/lynxos-posix-real-time-operating-system-rtos

The LynxOS RTOS is a Unix-like real-time operating system from Lynx Software Technologies (formerly "LynuxWorks"). Sometimes known as the Lynx Operating System, LynxOS features full POSIX conformance and, more recently, Linux compatibility. LynxOS is mostly used in real-time embedded systems, in applications for avionics, aerospace, the military, industrial process control and telecommunications.

== History ==
The first versions of LynxOS were written in 1986 in Dallas, Texas, by Mitchell Bunnell and targeted at a custom-built Motorola 68010-based computer. The first platform LynxOS ran on was an Atari 1040ST with cross development done on an Integrated Solutions UNIX machine. In 1988-1989, LynxOS was ported to the Intel 80386 architecture. Around 1989, application binary interface (ABI) compatibility with UNIX System V.3 was added. Compatibility with other operating systems, including Linux, followed.

Full Memory Management Unit support has been included in the kernel since 1989, for the reliability of protected memory and the performance advantages of virtual addresses. The PowerPC architecture is also supported, and in February 2015 Lynx announced planned support for the ARM Cortex A-family.

LynxOS components are designed for absolute determinism (hard real-time performance), which means that they respond within a known period of time. Predictable response times are ensured even in the presence of heavy input/output (I/O) due to the kernel's unique threading model, which allows interrupt routines to be very short and fast.

Lynx holds an expired patent on the technology that LynxOS uses to maintain hard real-time performance. U.S. patent 5,469,571 was granted to Lynx November 21, 1995: "Operating System Architecture using Multiple Priority Light Weight kernel Task-based Interrupt Handling."

In 2003, Lynx introduced a specialized version of LynxOS named LynxOS-178, especially for use in avionics applications that require certification to industry standards such as DO-178B.

In late 2022, support for the programming language Rust was added to the certified toolchain for LynxOS-178 and LynxElement unikernel.

The Usenet newsgroup comp.os.lynx is devoted to discussion of LynxOS.

== See also ==
- Rust for Linux
- Redox OS
