= Lynx Software Technologies =

American software company

Lynx Software Technologies, Inc
- Type: Private
- Industry: Embedded software
- Founded: 1988
- Headquarters: San Jose, California
- Key people: Tim Reed, CEO, Amanda Blum, CFO, Alan Maillet, CRO, Will Keegan, CTO
- Products: Operating Systems, Separation Kernel (Hypervisor), Tools
- Website: www.lynx.com

Lynx Software Technologies, Inc. (formerly LynuxWorks) is a San Jose, California software company founded in 1988. Lynx specializes in secure virtualization and open, reliable, certifiable real-time operating systems (RTOSes). Originally known as Lynx Real-Time Systems, the company changed its name to LynuxWorks in 2000 after acquiring, and merging with, ISDCorp (Integrated Software & Devices Corporation), an embedded systems company with a strong Linux background. In May 2014, the company changed its name to Lynx Software Technologies.

Lynx embraced open standards from its inception, with its original RTOS, LynxOS, featuring a UNIX-like user model and standard POSIX interfaces to embedded developers. LynxOS-178 is developed and certified to the FAA DO-178C DAL A safety standard and received the first and only FAA Reusable Software Component certificate for an RTOS. It supports ARINC API and FACE standards.

In 1989, LynxOS, the company's flagship RTOS, was selected for use in the NASA/IBM Space Station Freedom project. Lynx Software Technologies operating systems are also used in medical, industrial and communications systems around the world.

In early 2020, Lynx announced that the TR3 modernization program for the joint strike fighter had adopted Lynx’s LYNX MOSA.ic software development framework. The F-35 Lightning II Program (also known as the Joint Strike Fighter Program) is the US Department of Defense's focal point for defining affordable next generation strike aircraft weapon systems It is intended to replace a wide range of existing fighter, strike, and ground attack aircraft for the United States, the United Kingdom, Italy, Canada, Australia, the Netherlands, and their allies. After a competition between the Boeing X-32 and the Lockheed Martin X-35, a final design was chosen based on the X-35. This is the F-35 Lightning II, which will replace various tactical aircraft.

The company’s technology is also used in medical, industrial and communications systems around the world by companies like Airbus, Bosch, Denso, General Dynamics, Lockheed Martin, Raytheon, Rohde and Schwartz and Toyota.

== Operating system evolution and history ==
LynxOS is the company's real-time operating system. It is UNIX-compatible and POSIX-compliant. It features predictable worst-case response time, preemptive scheduling, real-time priorities, ROMable kernel, and memory locking. LynxOS 7.0 is marketed as a "military grade", general purpose multi-core hard real-time operating system, and is intended for developers to embed security features during the design process, rather than adding security features after development. LynxOS and LynxOS-178 have been deployed in safety-critical applications worldwide.

In 2003, the company introduced the LynxOS-178 real-time operating system, a specialized version of LynxOS geared toward avionics applications that require certification to industry standards such as DO-178B. LynxOS-178 is a commercial off-the-shelf (COTS) RTOS that fully satisfies the objectives of the DO-178B level A specification and meets requirements for Integrated Modular Avionics (IMA) developers. LynxOS-178 is a native POSIX, hard real-time partitioning operating system developed and certified to FAA DO-178B/C DAL A safety standards. It is the only Commercial-off-the-Shelf (COTS) OS to be awarded a Reusable Software Component (RSC) certificate from the FAA for re-usability in DO-178B/C certification projects. LynxOS-178 is the primary host for real-time POSIX and FACE applications within the LYNX MOSA.ic development and integration framework. LynxOS-178 satisfies the PSE 53/54 profiles for both dedicated and multi-purpose real-time as well as FACE applications.

The LynxSecure Hypervisor ("bare metal," type 1) and separation kernel was released in 2005. Within the LYNX MOSA.ic development framework, it acts as a programmable processor partitioning system leveraging hardware virtualization capabilities of modern multi-core processors to isolate computing resources.

In February 2019, Lynx announced LYNX MOSA.ic (pronounced “mosaic”). LYNX MOSA.ic is a software development framework for rapidly building security- and safety-critical software systems out of independent application modules.

== LYNX MOSA.ic ==
A modular software development framework, the framework allows developers to design and integrate multi-core safety and security systems for industries such as the avionics, industrial, automotive, and UAV/satellite industries.

=== Features ===
There are three LYNX MOSA.ic bundles used for building secure applications. These bundles include: LYNX MOSA.ic for Avionics, LYNX MOSA.ic for Industrial, and LYNX MOSA.ic for UAVs/Satellites. These bundles are referred to as the "Mission Critical Edge," as they focus on security. There are differences between these bundles' features, such as LYNX MOSAI.ic for Industrial's support for Azure IoT Edge and Windows 10 and LYNX MOSA.ic for Avionics' support for Arm and x86 processor architectures.

LYNX MOSA.ic is built on Lynx Software Technologies' LynxSecure separation kernel hypervisor, which helps isolate applications and manage critical system assets. LYNX MOSA.ic supports LynxOS-178, Linux, Windows, and third-party OS systems. LYNX MOSA.ic also has support for bare metal applications such as Lynx Simple Applications (LSA).

LYNX MOSA.ic's use of multi-core processors supports hardware virtualization. LYNX MOSA.ic's modular structure allows users to isolate computing resources into self-managed independent environments. TRACE32 provides JTAG debug support for the independent applications stored in LYNX MOSA.ic's modules.

=== History ===
LYNX MOSA.ic was first announced by Lynx Software Technologies in 2019. The framework was developed for integration with the U.S. Department of Defense's MOSA (Modular Open Systems Approach).

Starting in 2020, LYNX MOSA.ic is being utilized by the F-35 Joint Strike Fighter Program Office to support the development of upgraded mission system avionics for F-35 Lightning II fighter jets.

In August 2021, Lynx Software Technologies and Advantech announced a collaboration to offer Mission Critical Edge Starter Kits for IT/OT convergence through Lynx LYNX MOSA.ic for Industrial. Lynx also partnered with CODESYS Group to integrate their control automation technology into the LYNX MOSA.ic for Industrial product in August 2021. In July 2021, Lynx also partnered with Collins Aerospace, providing LYNX MOSA.ic for Avionics as the foundation for Collins Aerospace's Perigon flight computer. Lynx Software Technologies released LYNX MOSA.ic for Industrial on the Microsoft Azure marketplace in 2021.
