= Objective Interface Systems =

American computer communications company

Objective Interface Systems, Inc.
- Type: Private
- Industry: Computer software Computer hardware Publishing; Research and development
- Founded: Reston, Virginia (1989)
- Headquarters: 198 Van Buren Street, Herndon, Virginia, United States
- Key people: Bill Beckwith, CEO & CTO
- Products: ORBexpress; Black Channel; Black FireGuard
- Website: www.ois.com

Objective Interface Systems, Inc. is a computer communications software and hardware company. The company's headquarters are in Herndon, Virginia, USA. OIS develops, manufactures, licenses, and supports software and hardware products that generally fit into one or more of the following markets:

- Real-time communications middleware software and hardware
- Embedded communications middleware software and hardware
- High-performance communications middleware software and hardware
- Secure communications software and hardware

A popular OIS product is the ORBexpress CORBA middleware software. ORBexpress is most popular in the real-time and embedded computer markets. OIS supports the software version ORBexpress on more than 6,000 computing platforms (combinations of the versions of CPU families, operating systems, and language compilers). OIS also has FPGA versions of ORBexpress to allow hardware blocks on an FPGA to interoperate with software.

OIS engineers invented a form of communications security called the Partitioning Communication System or PCS. The PCS is a technical architecture that protects multiple Information Flows from influencing each other when communicated on a single network wire. The PCS is best implemented on a software separation operating system such as SELinux or a separation kernel.

OIS's communications products are most frequently found in the enterprise, telecom/datacom, mil/aero, medical, robotics, process control and transportation industries. Objective Interface is a privately held company and has developed software products since 1989 and hardware products since 2001.

The company is actively involved with various standards groups including:

- Common Criteria
- IEEE
- Network Centric Operations Industry Consortium
- Object Management Group (OMG)
- The Open Group
- Wireless Innovation Forum

== Corporate Headquarters ==
On September 1st, 2026, OIS relocated their headquarters to 198 Van Buren Street, Herndon, VA, 20170. The move allowed OIS to triple their footprint to support their growth.
