= PhpBB =

Free and open-source Internet forum package written in PHP

phpBB

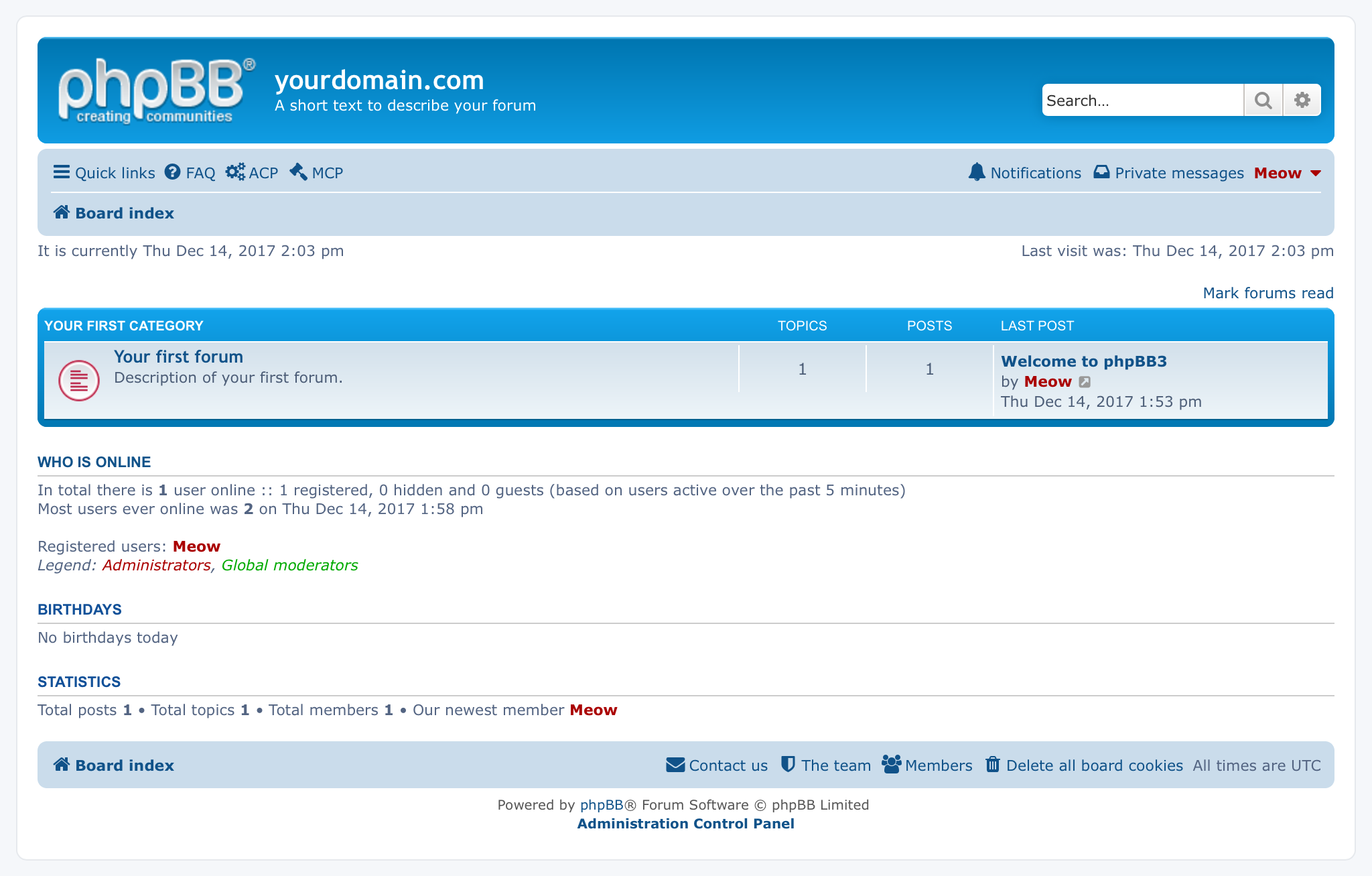
- A default installation of phpBB 3.2
- Developer: phpBB Limited
- Release: December 16, 2000
- Stable release: 3.3.19 (2026-09-24; 52 days ago) [±]
- Written in: PHP
- Size: 7.54 MB (compressed)
- Available in: 54 languages
- List of languages American English, Arabic, Argentinian Spanish, Basque, Belarusian, Brazilian Portuguese, British English, Bulgarian, Catalan, Croatian, Czech, Danish, Dutch, Estonian, Finnish, French, Gaelic, Galician, German, Greek, Hebrew, Hungarian, Indonesian, Italian, Japanese, Kurdish, Lithuanian, Macedonian, Chinese, Mexican Spanish, Norwegian, Persian, Polish, Portuguese, Romanian, Russian, Serbian, Slovak, Slovenian, Spanish, Swedish, Tatar, Thai, Turkish, Ukrainian, Urdu, Vietnamese
- Type: Internet forum
- License: GNU General Public License version 2
- Website: www.phpbb.com
- Repository: github.com/phpbb/phpbb

phpBB is an Internet forum package written in the PHP scripting language. The name "phpBB" is an abbreviation of PHP Bulletin Board. Available under the GNU General Public License, phpBB is free and open-source.

Features of phpBB include support for multiple database engines (MariaDB, Microsoft SQL Server, MySQL, PostgreSQL, SQLite, Oracle Database), flat message structure (as opposed to threaded), hierarchical subforums, topic split/merge/lock, user groups, multiple attachments per post, full-text search, plugins and various notification options (e-mail, Jabber instant messaging, ATOM feeds).

== History ==
phpBB was founded by James Atkinson as a simple UBB-like forum for his own website on June 17, 2000. Nathan Codding and John Abela joined the development team after phpBB's CVS repository was moved to SourceForge.net, and work on version 1.0.0 began. A fully functional, pre-release version of phpBB was made available in July.

=== phpBB 1.0.0 ===
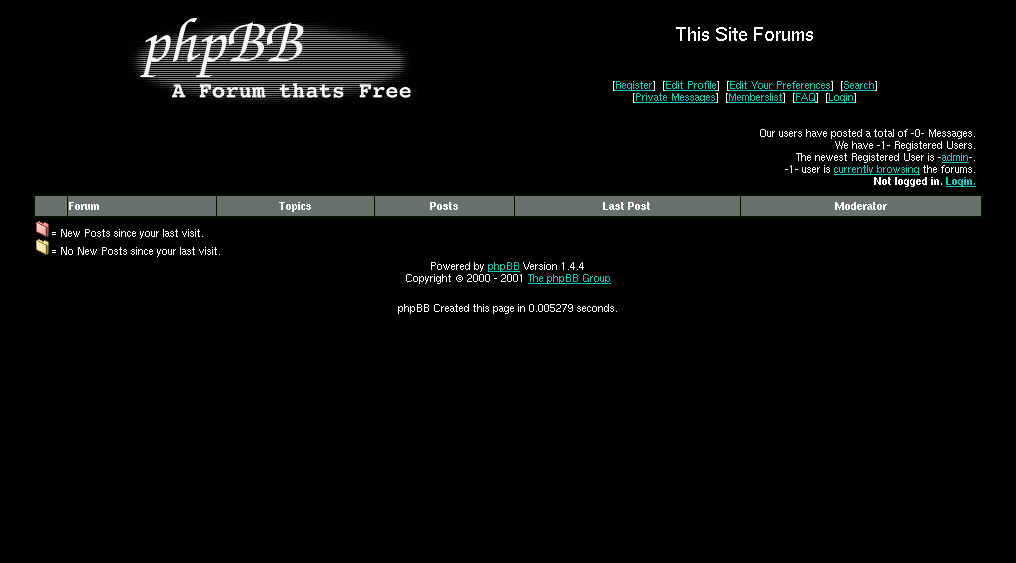
A default installation of the original phpBB

phpBB 1.0.0 was released on December 16, 2000, with subsequent improvements to the 1.x codebase coming in two more major installments. The final release in the 1.x line was phpBB 1.4.4, released on November 6, 2001. During the lifetime of the 1.x series, Bart van Bragt, Paul S. Owen (former co-manager of the project), Jonathan Haase, and Frank Feingold joined the team. phpBB 1.x is no longer supported, and virtually no websites continue to use it.

=== phpBB 2.0.x ===
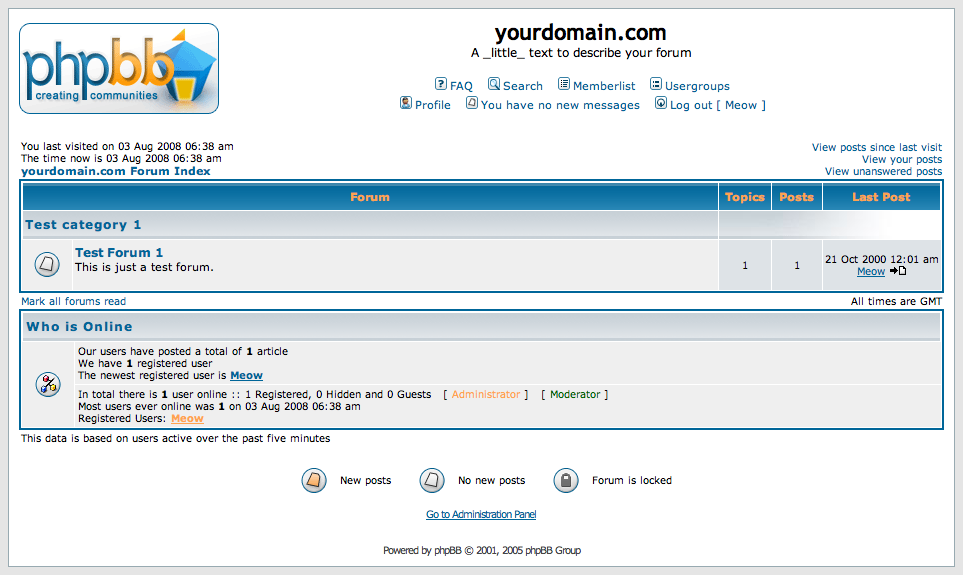
A default installation of phpBB 2.0

In February 2001, phpBB 2.0.x began development entirely from scratch; the developer's ambitions for phpBB had outgrown the original codebase. Doug Kelly joined the team shortly afterward. After a year of development and extensive testing, phpBB 2.0.0, dubbed the "Super Furry" version, was released on April 4, 2002, three days later than intended.

phpBB2 was the predecessor of the present-day phpBB3. Developed during 2001–2002, the source code was written primarily to run on PHP 3.0 and 4.0 (version 2.0.13 upped the minimum requirement to PHP 4.0.3 due to a necessary security fix), and by the time that phpBB3 was released in late 2007, the developers and other team members felt that it no longer met their quality coding standards, and announced plans for the retirement/end of support of 2.0.x within a few months of 3.0.0's release. phpBB2 was never officially supported under PHP 5. Although many users had no problems running it after making a few changes to PHP 5's default configuration settings, the teams chose not to offer support for this configuration.

Official support for phpBB2 ended on January 1, 2009, and the 2.0.x support forums have been locked. Furthermore, all development for phpBB2, including security patches, has ceased as of February 1, 2009. However, a number of unofficial support sites for phpBB2 have formed to fill the void.

Many administrators still prefer to run phpBB2 because they think it provides a simpler administration interface and has an ecosystem of MODs (modifications) and styles that allow for customization, which are not compatible with phpBB3.

The default theme in phpBB2 is named subSilver (The predecessor to SubSilver2, the default in phpBB3), and was designed by Tom "subBlue" Beddard. At the time that it premiered in 2001, it was a revolutionary new design for bulletin boards, and many bulletin board themes since have borrowed many cues and design elements from subSilver.

Some of phpBB2's major features included the following:

- A templated style system intended to simplify customisation and keep the PHP code separate from the HTML.
- Support for internationalisation through a language pack system; 48 translations are available for phpBB2 as of 2007.
- Compatibility with multiple database management systems including MySQL, PostgreSQL, Microsoft SQL Server, and Microsoft Access,
- Code and interface customizations, termed MODs and styles.

The last official release of the 2.0.x line is 2.0.23, released on February 17, 2008. However, the code for phpBB 2.0.24 still remains, unreleased, in the Git repository.

=== phpBB 3.0.x ===
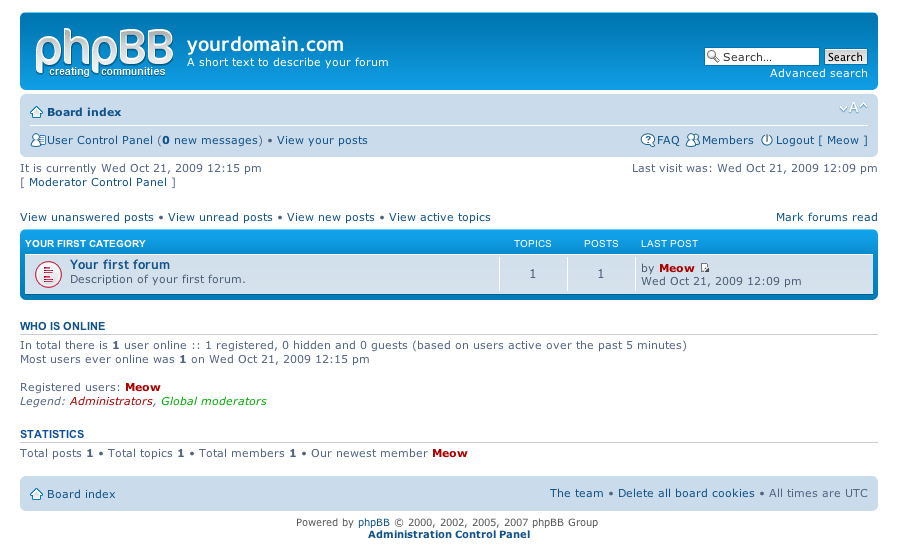
A default installation of phpBB 3.x

Work on phpBB 3.0.x began in late 2002. It was originally intended to be released as phpBB 2.2, and the first planned feature list was announced on May 25, 2003. However, as development progressed, the developers realised that phpBB 2.1.x (the development release cycle for 2.2) had eliminated virtually all compatibility with the 2.0.x line, so the version number for release was changed to 3.0.0, in keeping with the Linux kernel versioning scheme, which phpBB followed at the time. In September 2005, Paul Owen resigned as the Development Team Leader and Meik Sievertsen was promoted to the role.

In March 2007, the phpBB team launched their new website, powered by phpBB3 with the new prosilver style. The prosilver style was originally not intended to be revealed until the final release of phpBB 3.0.0.

On April 30, 2007, phpBB founder and co-Project Manager James Atkinson officially resigned from his duties towards phpBB, citing personal circumstances. With the announcement also came the announcement that phpBB was now newly independent and that the team leaders would be collectively taking charge of the decisions in the future of the project. At the end of May, an announcement was made that Jonathan "SHS`" Stanley, the other co-Project Manager, was stepping down as well for personal reasons.

The first beta of phpBB3 was released in June 2006, and the first release candidate was released in May 2007. The phpBB3 codebase received an external security audit in September, which was done by SektionEins. Finally, phpBB 3.0.0 "Olympus" (also dubbed the Gold release) was published on December 13, 2007.

On July 7, 2007, the teams announced that phpBB had been nominated as a finalist for the SourceForge.net Community Choice Awards in the category of "Best Project for Communications". At the end of the month, SourceForge.net announced that phpBB had won the award for "Best Project for Communications", and in honour of the award, SourceForge.net donated $1000 in phpBB's name to Marie Curie Cancer Care. phpBB also won a "Thingamagoop" from Bleep Labs, and "bragging rights for a full year."

In September 2007, the teams launched an official phpBB podcast. It was recorded by a rotating group of phpBB team members with occasional guests, and discussed a number of phpBB-related topics, as well as answering questions e-mailed in from listeners. However, the podcast only lasted for a few episodes and production ceased the following spring. Its successor is generally considered to be the new phpBB weblog, which launched in July 2008. The blog is written by phpBB team members (with occasional guest posts by community members) on various topics related to phpBB and provide users with a unique inside look at the activities of the phpBB teams.

The phpBB teams held their first-ever phpBB users' conference in London on July 20, 2008, which was titled "Londonvasion 2008." Londonvasion featured presentations by phpBB team members on various topics important to the phpBB community, MOD authors, and developers. Londonvasion provided a unique opportunity to socialize with members of the phpBB teams. The event also represented the first time that most members of the teams had a chance to meet each other in person.

The phpBB teams underwent numerous changes in 2009. On January 1, the teams formally ended support for phpBB2. Many of the non-development teams released betas and release candidates of side projects during this time. The first beta of AutoMOD, an automatic installer of phpBB MODifications, was released by the Extensions Team (formerly known as the MOD Team) on December 22, 2008. The first release candidate of the Unified MOD Install Library (UMIL), a framework for allowing MOD authors to design simple database installation scripts, was released by the Extensions Team on January 12, 2009. The first release candidate of the Support Toolkit, a package of tools to diagnose and fix common support-related issues with phpBB, was released by the Support Team on June 24.

On June 10, 2009, the phpBB Development Team broke with their precedent of keeping future development plans under wraps and publicly previewed a series of new features that would be coming in phpBB 3.0.6. After four RC releases, phpBB 3.0.6 was released on November 17. The most notable new features included a bare-bones quick reply editor (a feature which the teams had historically been firmly opposed to), support for ACM (cache) plugins, ATOM feed support, and a plugin-based CAPTCHA system, including built-in support for reCAPTCHA among others. The modularization of phpBB's CAPTCHA also provided an API for MOD authors to write CAPTCHA plugins, allowing for greater diversification of the CAPTCHAs used in phpBB installations. The Extensions Team also ran a competition to encourage CAPTCHA plugin development.

On June 10, 2009, phpBB's Development Team revealed that the next phpBB3 release, 3.0.6, would include a significant number of new features. This is unusual for a minor release which is typically limited to bug and security fixes. New features would include support for new CAPTCHA plugins, ATOM feeds, support for new cache plugins (XCache, Alternative PHP Cache, eAccelerator, Memcache, and a "null" no-cache plugin), and quick reply (an often-requested feature by a subset of phpBB users) among other minor feature additions. phpBB 3.0.6 has had four RC releases, and its final release was on November 17, 2009.

The final stable release of phpBB 3.0 was 3.0.14, released May 4, 2015. End of Life for phpBB 3.0.x was November 2015.

=== phpBB 3.1.x ===
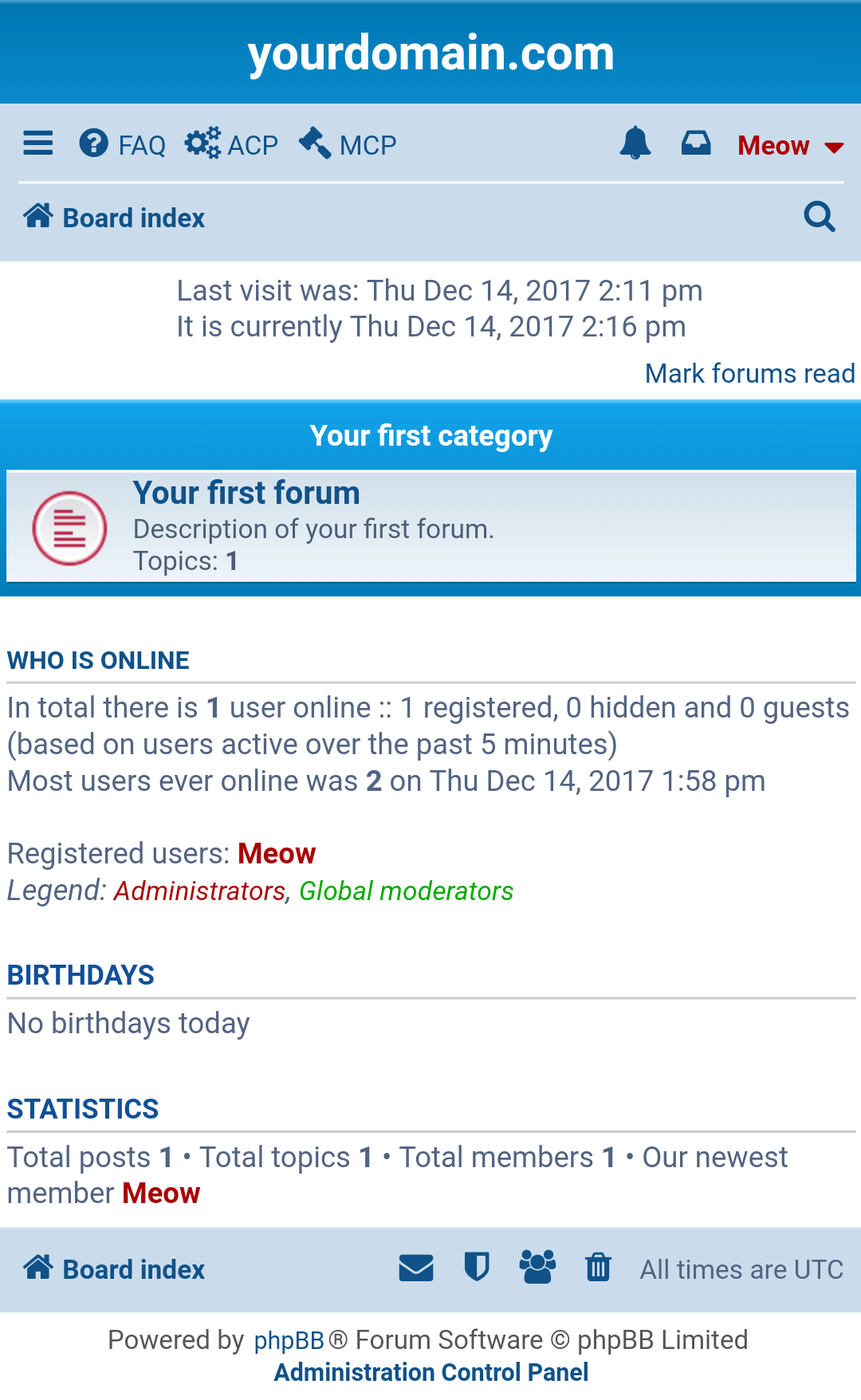
The responsive design since phpBB 3.1

In 2009 the phpBB Development Team had begun working on phpBB 3.1, formerly versioned as phpBB 3.2. (Before July 29, 2009, phpBB followed the original Linux kernel versioning scheme, in which the middle number represents a development version if it is odd and a stable version if it is even). The developers previewed their planned feature list at Londonvasion, and new features include a complete overhaul of the Moderator Control Panel (MCP) and moderation capabilities, implementation of AJAX where it is applicable and helpful, a trigger-based event system, a completely rewritten BBCode system, RSS feed support, enhancements to custom profile fields, enhancements to private messaging, a new authentication system with OpenID support, and numerous other small changes and features. The phpBB teams maintain a website for phpBB development named Area51. In keeping with the tradition to codename every new phpBB3 release after Martian mountains, phpBB 3.1 was code-named "Ascraeus", named after Ascraeus Mons, the second-tallest mountain on Mars. (Olympus Mons, which 3.0 was named after, is the tallest.)

On July 29, 2009, the Development Team announced "significant changes" to the phpBB's development process and release cycle. Chief among these was the decision to abandon the former Linux kernel versioning scheme, meaning that whether part of the version number was even or odd no longer was significant. As such, Ascraeus (the successor to 3.0.0 Olympus) is to become phpBB 3.1.0. (The original versioning scheme dictated that 3.1.x would be a development branch, meaning that Ascraeus would have been released as 3.2.0.) Subsequent feature releases of phpBB3 will be versioned as 3.2.0, 3.3.0, etc. phpBB 4.0.0 will represent a fundamentally redesigned version of phpBB. The strategy also committed the teams to continue supporting an older "stable" branch for at least 6–9 months after a newer "feature" branch was released. However, an exception was made for 3.0.6, which was already in development. Although it contained enough significant new features that it could have been considered a 3.1.0 release, it remained a part of the 3.0.x branch, which also meant that the teams did not have to simultaneously continue supporting 3.0.5 after 3.0.6's release.

In January 2010, Meik Sievertsen stepped down as Lead Developer, instead taking on the roles of developer and "Server Manager". Nils Adermann was then promoted to Lead Developer. Since then phpBB have been working on moving over to the Symfony web framework and released phpBB 3.1.0 on October 28, 2014 In March 2010, phpBB moved source code versioning from Subversion to Git in order to improve developer workflow and better involve the community.

On April 26, 2013, phpBB 3.1 entered the stage of feature freeze. "Ascraeus" was finalized and released on October 28, 2014 after several release candidates. A future release "Rhea" (3.2.x) will be made January 7, 2017.

On October 12, 2016, phpBB released the latest stable "Ascraeus" version: 3.1.10. Due to the late release of 3.2, it was announced that end of maintenance for 3.1 would be extended to June 2017, and end of life for 3.1 extended to December 2017.

In addition to the development of phpBB 3.1, other phpBB teams also are in the process of developing numerous other tools for use by the community. Development for these tools was followed on the phpBB Code Forge, which contained the Subversion repositories for these tools and the main phpBB development trunk.

=== phpBB 3.2.x ===
The first of two release candidates for 3.2.x "Rhea" was made available on June 27, 2016, the second on December 9, 2016. It was announced on December 25, 2016, that the official launch for phpBB 3.2.0 would be on January 7, 2017. phpBB 3.2 introduces major changes and new functionality. Among the new features are a completely revised installer including CLI (Command-Line Interface) support, a new BBCode system that adds more power to quotes and supports emojis, and full support for PHP 7.1.

=== phpBB 3.3.x ===
The first release candidate for 3.3.x "Proteus" was made available on December 23, 2019. On January 6, 2020, phpBB officially launched phpBB 3.3.0. It was built upon 3.2 "Rhea" and it's their big step towards a more modern base while maintaining a clear update path. Starting in version 3.3.3, phpBB began supporting installations using PHP 8 and MySQL 8. The latest updates to the branch focus on stability improvements and user interface enhancements.

== MODs ==
MODs are code modifications created by the phpBB community, often used to extend the functionality of or change the display of phpBB. The term is capitalized to distinguish code modifications from forum moderators, the latter of which is often abbreviated as "mods". Modifications referred to in this manner are not authored by the phpBB developers and do not enjoy the same level of support as unmodified official code. The phpBB Extensions Team (formerly known as the phpBB MOD Team), headed by David Colón (known as DavidIQ in the community), accepts modifications from community sources for validation, and modifications that meet the Extensions Team's standards are made available for download from the phpBB Customisations Database. Other sites also provide phpBB2 and phpBB3 modifications for download. Some of the sites have their own standards, which they validate to, and other sites do not do any validation, however, the phpBB teams do not offer support for boards using MODs downloaded from sites other than phpBB.com. Documentation for phpBB3 MODding is provided by the Extensions Team. MODs are not accepted for the 3.1.x line of phpBB since Extensions have taken their place from that version forward.

=== MODX ===
MODX is an XML-based document format developed by the phpBB Extensions Team that is used to describe the steps required to modify the source code of a web application in order to install a modification. Although it can theoretically be utilised for any web application, it was developed for and is primarily used by MODs for phpBB. The phpBB Extensions Team requires that MODs submitted to its database conform to the MODX specifications and other policies. The primary purpose of using an XML-based format is to better allow automatic installation tools, such as AutoMOD, to read and complete the installation instructions. MODX files can be viewed in a web browser using an included XSLT file. The latest revision of the MODX spec is 1.2.6, released on December 15, 2012.

=== AutoMOD ===
AutoMOD is a tool developed by the phpBB Extensions Team that parses and automatically installs phpBB3 MODs distributed in the MODX format. Users simply have to upload the contents of a MOD download to their phpBB source directory and run AutoMOD, which will parse the MOD instructions and make the necessary file changes. Depending on the server configurations, it will either automatically merge the changes into place using FTP, or will create a compressed archive of the changed files for the user to copy into place. AutoMOD is also used by the MOD Team members during validation to ensure that the MODX files are valid and the MOD can be successfully installed on a vanilla phpBB installation.

The current version of AutoMOD is 1.0.2. AutoMOD can be downloaded from the AutoMOD information page and support can be obtained in the AutoMOD support forum.

AutoMOD is the successor to EasyMOD, a tool for phpBB2 which was also developed by the phpBB Extensions Team and performed essentially the same task. The last version of EasyMOD was 0.4.0, released on June 30, 2008. Support for EasyMOD is no longer provided since phpBB2 is retired.

=== Unified MOD Installation Library (UMIL) ===
The Unified MOD Installation Library is a library designed to simplify the installation and uninstallation of the database side of MODs. It is designed to be useful for configuring the forum for the new MOD, performing database actions such as adding and removing tables and columns and purging the forum's cache. UMIL is GPL licensed and the latest version is 1.0.5. It can be downloaded from the UMIL page. To create a UMI-file automatically, a MOD author can use the Unified MOD Installation File creation tool.

== Security ==
In December 2004, a large number of websites were defaced by the Santy worm, which used vulnerabilities in outdated versions of phpBB2 to overwrite PHP and HTML pages. There have also been a few times where new releases of phpBB have come out a few days apart, most recently with version 3.2.7 in May 2019. The phpBB Group, attempting to learn from previous failures, performed a codebase security audit before the release of 2.0.18. The phpBB3 codebase received an external security audit in September 2007, which was done by SektionEins. The sixth release candidate of phpBB3 was published following the results of the security audit.

Changes were made to phpBB2 to avoid problems in the future, such as a re-authentication system for the administration panel, backported from phpBB3. This was introduced after a cookie verification issue allowed attackers to gain administrator access.

In November 2005, the phpBB Group announced a new Incident Investigation Team (IIT), a sub-team of their Support Team, which is responsible for assisting users in the cleanup and repair of an attacked phpBB installation and investigating reports of new exploits. The team announced a tracker the following January where administrators of attacked bulletin boards could report an attack, and receive support from the IIT.

The CAPTCHA system in phpBB2 has proven vulnerable to automated registrations, with numerous phpBB-based forums being swamped by forum spam. phpBB3 has improved its anti-spam options available to forum administrators, including a new CAPTCHA system, suspensions, user logging, and other various features. The phpBB team has published recommendations on protecting the boards from spam. Currently the best method is to use a Q&A (question-answer) challenge, which was introduced into phpBB 3.0.6. phpBB3 has a much stronger CAPTCHA system, however during the phpBB3 development/beta phase it was frequently criticised for being difficult to read. The development team has been working on improving its readability prior to phpBB3's final release.

Additionally, the teams have announced that each minor release of phpBB3 (3.0.1, 3.0.2, etc.) will be preceded by individual release candidates in an effort to prevent instances where subsequent releases would be only days apart (as happened a couple of times during the 2.0.x line).

phpBB 3 notifies the administrator of new releases via the Administration Control Panel.

In June 2026, a critical auth bypass vulnerability was discovered in phpBB that could allow attackers to log in as any forum user in default installations, even with OAuth not configured or enabled. The vulnerability was fixed in phpBB 3.3.17. The same release also fixed an OAuth state-verification vulnerability that could lead to account takeover on installations using OAuth.

== phpBB community ==
phpBB has a community of users who contribute to the overall project with content such as Extensions, MODs, and Styles. They also provide supplementary support as assistance to the phpBB Support Team. Community users are encouraged to participate in these support requests and to contribute to the overall betterment of phpBB core code.

== See also ==
- Comparison of Internet forum software
