= Web Application Messaging Protocol =

WebSocket subprotocol registered at IANA

WAMP is a WebSocket subprotocol registered at IANA, specified to offer routed RPC and PubSub. Its design goal is to provide an open standard for soft, real-time message exchange between application components and ease the creation of loosely coupled architectures based on microservices. Because of this, it is a suitable enterprise service bus (ESB), fit for developing responsive web applications or coordinating multiple connected IoT devices.

== Characteristics ==
=== Structure ===
WAMP requires a reliable, ordered, full-duplex message channel as a transport layer, and by default uses Websocket. However, implementations can use other transports matching these characteristics and communicate with WAMP over e.g. raw sockets, Unix sockets, or HTTP long poll.

Message serialization assumes integers, strings and ordered sequence types are available, and defaults to JSON as the most common format offering these. Implementations often provide MessagePack as a faster alternative to JSON at the cost of an additional dependency.

=== Workflow ===
WAMP is architectured around client–client communications with a central software, the router, dispatching messages between them. The typical data exchange workflow is:

- Clients connect to the router using a transport, establishing a session.
- The router identifies the clients and gives them permissions for the current session.
- Clients send messages to the router which dispatches them to the proper targets using the attached URIs.

The clients send these messages using the two high-level primitives that are RPC and PUB/SUB, doing four core interactions:

- register: a client exposes a procedure to be called remotely.
- call: a client asks the router to get the result of an exposed procedure from another client.
- subscribe: a client notifies its interest in a topic.
- publish: a client publishes information about this topic.

This can have subtle variations depending on the underlying transport. However, implementation details are hidden to the end-user who only programs with the two high-level primitives that are RPC and PubSub.

=== Security ===
As WAMP uses Websocket, connections can be wrapped in TLS for encryption. Even when full confidentiality is not established, several mechanisms are implemented to isolate components and avoid man-in-the-middle attacks. Default implementations ensure that trying to register an already registered procedure will fail.

Routers can define realms as administrative domains, and clients must specify which realm they want to join upon connection. Once joined, the realm will act as a namespace, preventing clients connected to a realm from using IDs defined in another for RPC and PubSub. Realms also have permissions attached and can limit the clients to one subset of the REGISTER/CALL/PubSub actions available.

Some realms can only be joined by authenticated clients, using various authentication methods such as using TLS certificate, cookies or a simple ticket.

=== Routed RPCs ===
Unlike with traditional RPCs, which are addressed directly from a caller to the entity offering the procedure (typically a server backend) and are strictly unidirectional (client-to-server), RPCs in WAMP are routed by a middleware and work bidirectionally.

Registration of RPCs is with the WAMP router, and calls to procedures are similarly issued to the WAMP router. This means first of all that a client can issue all RPCs via the single connection to the WAMP router, and does not need to have any knowledge what client is currently offering the procedure, where that client resides or how to address it. This can indeed change between calls, opening up the possibility for advanced features such as load-balancing or fail-over for procedure calls.

It additionally means that all WAMP clients are equal in that they can offer procedures for calling. This avoids the traditional distinction between clients and server backends, and allows architectures where browser clients call procedures on other browser clients, with an API that feels like peer to peer communication.

However, even with multi-tiers architectures, the router is still a single point of failure. For this reason, some router implementation roadmaps include clustering features.

== Implementations ==
=== Clients ===
As WAMP main targets are Web applications and the Internet of Things, the first client implementations are in languages well established in these industries (only WAMP v2 clients listed):

Client library	Language
AngularWAMP	JavaScript for the AngularJS framework
AutobahnCpp	C++ 11
wamplv	LabVIEW (G)
AutobahnJS	JavaScript (browser and Node.js)
AutobahnPython	Python
wampy	Python
Net::WAMP	Perl
backbone.WAMP	JavaScript for the Backbone.js library
CppWAMP	C++ 11
Erwa	Erlang
Jawampa	Java
Loowy	Lua
MDWamp	Objective-C
Minion	PHP
rx.wamp	JavaScript for the React library
Thruway	PHP
WAMP POCO	C++
wampcc	C++
WampSharp	C#
Wampy.js	JavaScript (browser only)
nexus	Go

The minimum requirements to build a WAMP client are the abilities to use sockets and to serialise to JSON. Thus, many modern languages already fulfill these requirements with their standard library. Additional features which would add dependencies, such as TLS encryptions or MessagePack serialization, are optional.

However, the persistent nature of WebSocket connections requires the use of non-blocking libraries and asynchronous APIs. In languages with one official mechanism such as JavaScript, Erlang or Go, this is not an issue. But for languages with several competing solutions for asynchronous programming, such as Python or PHP, it forces the client author to commit to a specific part of the ecosystem.

For the same reason, integrating legacy projects can also require work. As an example, most popular Web Python frameworks are using WSGI, a synchronous API, and running a WAMP client inside a WSGI worker needs manual adapters such as crochet.

=== Routers ===
While routers can technically be embedded directly into the application code and some client libraries also provide a router, this architecture is discouraged by the specification.

Since the router is a moving part, it is best used as a swappable black box just like one would consider Apache or Nginx for HTTP:

Router	Language
Bondy	Erlang
Crossbar.io	Python (CPython and PyPy)
Erwa	Erlang
wampcc	C++
Jawampa	Java
Thruway	PHP
wamp.rt	JavaScript (Node.js only)
WampSharp	C#
Wiola	Lua
Nightlife-Rabbit	JavaScript (Node.js only)
nexus	Go

Tavendo, the company from which originated the protocol, is also the author of Crossbar.io, which promotes itself as the de facto router implementation. As they are promoting microservice-based architectures, Crossbar.io embeds a service manager for hosting and monitoring WAMP app components, a static file Web server, and a WSGI container. Being written with the Twisted library, it is one of the implementations that can be set up in production without a proxy, aiming to replace stacks such as Nginx associated with Supervisor and Gunicorn.

== Use cases ==
Being a WebSocket sub-protocol, WAMP fits naturally anywhere one would use raw web sockets, as a way to synchronize clients such as Web browsers, push notifications to them and allow soft real-time collaboration between users. It has also the same limitations, requiring client support, which is missing for Internet Explorer versions older than 10. This is mitigated by the existence of polyfills using more portable technologies such as Flash or the use of HTTP Longpoll as a fallback. In that sense, WAMP is a competitor to Meteor's DDP.

WAMP also targets the IoT, where it is used in the same way as MQTT as a light and efficient medium to orchestrate clusters of connected objects. The implementations in various languages make it suitable to control and monitor small devices such as the Raspberry Pi (in Python) or the Tessel (in JavaScript).

And last but not least, WAMP can act as an enterprise service bus, serving as the link between microservices like one would do with CORBA, ZeroMQ, Apache Thrift, SOAP or AMQP.

== Evolution ==
WAMP is currently in version 2 which introduced routed RPC. As of now, all routers are compatible with version 2. Some clients remain unported: Wamp.io, AutobahnAndroid, and cljWAMP.

The version 2 of the specification is divided into two parts: the basic profile, including the router RPC and Pub/Sub, and the advanced profile, featuring trust levels, URI pattern matching, and client listing. The basic profile is considered stable and is what current libraries are implementing while the advanced profile is still in evolution.

== Comparison ==
The WAMP website claims the following selling points for the technology:

- Native PubSub: supports Publish & Subscribe out of the box (no extension required).
- RPC: supports Remote Procedure Calls out of the box (no extension required).
- Routed RPC: supports routed (not only point-to-point) Remote Procedure Calls.
- Web native: runs natively on the Web (without tunneling or bridging).
- Cross Language: works on and between different programming languages and run-times.
- Open Standard: Is an open, official specification implemented by different vendors.

On the other hand, WAMP does not try to achieve some goals of other protocols:

- Full object passing like CORBA.
- Data synchronization like DDP.
- Peer-to-peer communication like ZeroMQ.
- Multi-media streaming like WebRTC.
- Large file transfer like HTTP.

Nevertheless, numerous protocols share some characteristics with WAMP:

Technology	PubSub	RPC	Routed RPC	Web native	Cross Language	Open Standard
WAMP	Yes	Yes	Yes	Yes	Yes	Yes
AJAX		Yes		Yes	Yes	
AMQP	Yes	Yes			Yes	Yes
Apache Thrift		Yes			Yes	
Capn'n'Proto		Yes			Yes	
Comet				Yes	Yes	
OMG DDS	Yes				Yes	Yes
D-Bus					Yes	
CORBA	Yes	Yes			Yes	Yes
DCOM	Yes	Yes			Yes	
Java JMS	Yes					Yes
Java RMI		Yes				Yes
JSON-RPC		Yes		Yes	Yes	Yes
MQTT	Yes			Yes	Yes	Yes
REST		Yes		Yes	Yes	
SOAP		Yes		Yes	Yes	Yes
Socket.io	Yes			Yes		
SockJS				Yes	Yes	
STOMP	Yes			Yes	Yes	Yes
XML-RPC		Yes		Yes	Yes	Yes
XMPP	Yes	Yes		Yes	Yes	Yes
ZeroMQ	Yes				Yes	
DDP	Yes	Yes		Yes	Yes	

While DDP does Pub/Sub under the hood to synchronize data sets, it does not expose PubSub primitives. It also is an open specification with several implementations, but not registered as a standard.
