= BSB =

BSB may refer to:

== Computing ==
- Back-side bus, data bus in a computer

== Media, arts and entertainment ==
- Backstreet Boys, American boy band
- British Satellite Broadcasting, former UK satellite television broadcaster
- Beat Sneak Bandit, 2012 video game

== Places ==
- Bandar Seri Begawan, the capital of Brunei
- Brasília, Brazil
- Brasília International Airport, Brazil, IATA code
- Samarinda International Airport, BSB, Samarinda
- Varanasi Junction railway station, Varanasi, India (station code)

== Banking ==
- Bank Services Billing, electronic bills sent by banks
- Bank state branch, branch code used in Australia
- Banking Standards Board, promoting standards in the banking industry in the UK
- Beneficial State Bank, an Oakland, California-based community development bank

== Legal ==
- Bar Standards Board, regulating barristers in England and Wales

== Schools and universities ==
- Basel School of Business in Switzerland
- British School of Brussels in Brussels
- British School of Bahrain in Bahrain
- British School of Beijing in China
- Burgundy School of Business in France
- British School of Barcelona in Spain

== Science and technology ==
- British Standard Brass, a screw thread standard

== Organizations ==
- Bayerische Staatsbibliothek, Bavarian State Library
- Broad Sustainable Building, is a Chinese construction company
- BPO Standards Board, applying BPO standards and guidelines in real estate
- Barons Bus Lines, an American bus company

== Military ==
- Brigade Speciale Beveiligingsopdrachten, Dutch special forces

== Sports ==
- British Superbike Championship, motorcycle racing championship
- Broad Street Bullies, nickname of the Philadelphia Flyers teams of the 1970s
- İstanbul Büyükşehir Belediyespor (basketball) or İstanbul BŞB, Turkey

== Politics ==
- БСБ, a Russian anti-war flag
