= OMQ =

OMQ may refer to:

- Old Master Q, a Hong Kong comic
- ZeroMQ, also written as 0MQ
