= Thttpd =

Open source software

thttpd
- Original author: Jef Poskanzer
- Release: 3 November 1995; 30 years ago
- Stable release: 2.29 / 23 May 2018; 8 years ago
- Written in: C
- Operating system: POSIX
- Available in: English
- Type: Web server
- License: BSD licenses variant
- Website: acme.com/software/thttpd/

thttpd (tiny/turbo/throttling HTTP server) is an open source software web server from ACME Laboratories, designed for simplicity, a small execution footprint and speed.

== Design and features ==
thttpd is single-threaded and portable: it compiles cleanly on most Unix-like operating systems, including FreeBSD, SunOS 4, Solaris 2, BSD/OS, Linux, and OSF/1. It has an executable memory size of about 50 kB. While it can be used as a simplified replacement to more feature-rich servers, it is uniquely suited to service high volume requests for static data—for example as an image hosting server. The first "t" in thttpd stands for variously tiny, turbo, or throttling.

thttpd has a bandwidth throttling feature which enables the server administrator to limit the maximum bit rate at which certain types of files may be transferred. For example, the administrator may choose to restrict the transfer of JPEG image files to at most 20 kilobytes per second. This prevents the connection from becoming saturated so that the server will still be responsive under heavy load, with the tradeoff that file transfer speed is reduced. thttpd does not support the X-Forwarded-For header.

== Forks ==
There are at least 2 public forks of thttpd:

- sthttpd by Anthony Basile, focusing on Gentoo Linux patches
- Merecat by Joachim Nilsson, adding a number of features, most notably SSL support

== See also ==
- Comparison of web server software
- Embedded HTTP server
- NanoHTTPD
