= Real estate owned =

Class of lender owned property in the US

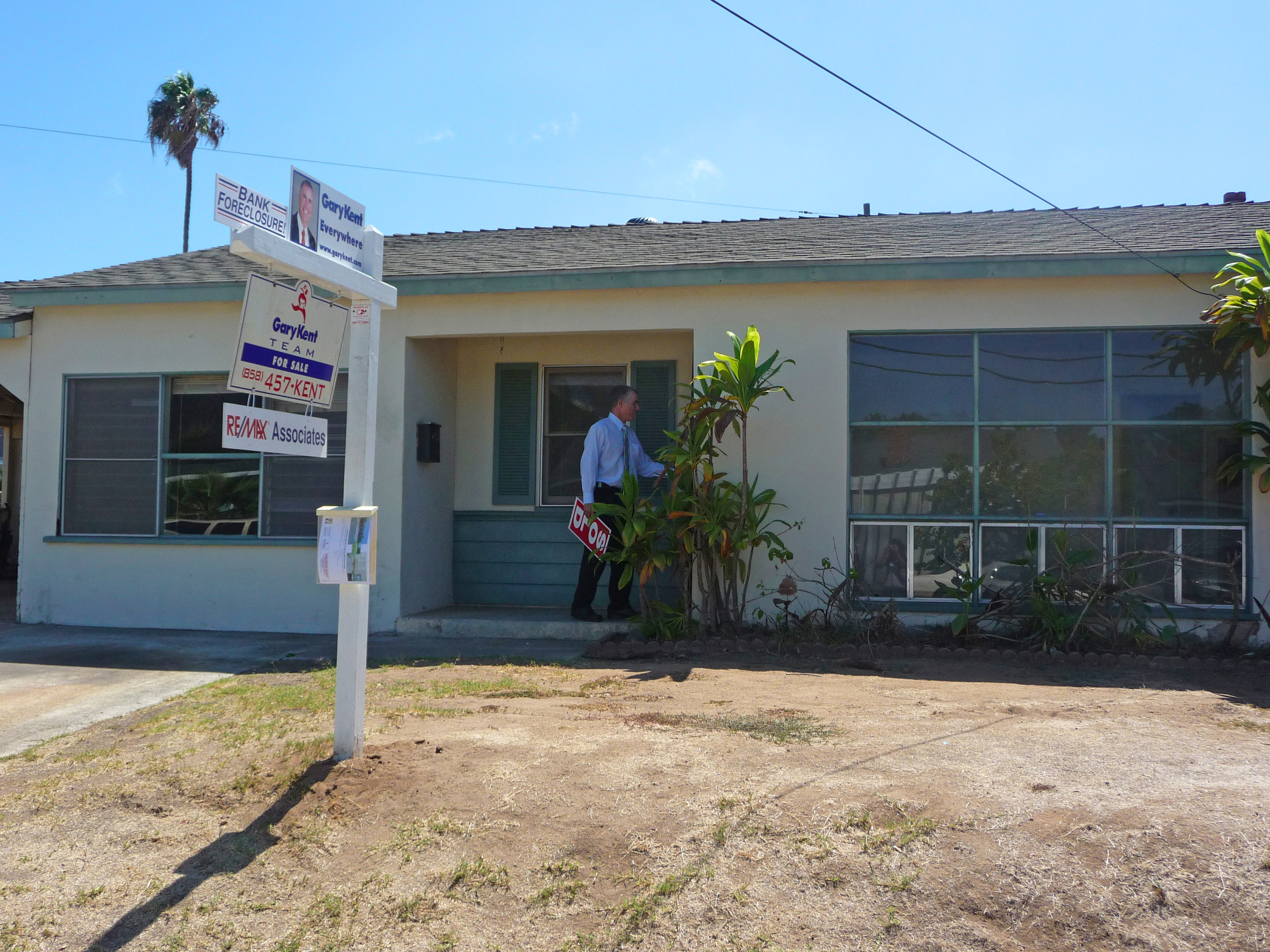
REO sale property in San Diego, California

Real estate owned, or REO, is a term used in the United States to describe a class of property owned by a lender—typically a bank, government agency, or government loan insurer—after an unsuccessful sale at a foreclosure auction. A foreclosing beneficiary will typically set the opening bid at such an auction for at least the outstanding loan amount. If there are no interested bidders, then the beneficiary will legally repossess the property. This is commonly the case when the amount owed on the home is higher than the current market value of the foreclosure property, such as with a mortgage loan made at a high loan-to-value during a real estate bubble. As soon as the beneficiary repossesses the property it is listed on their books as REO and categorized as an asset. (See non-performing asset).

== Origin ==
The term originates from the term other real estate owned (OREO), which is used on financial statements to account for real estate assets which are owned by a financial institution but are not directly related to its business. Such institutions are normally lenders, who are primarily in the business of making loans with the intent that nearly all of those loans will be repaid in full with interest. Seizing, managing and reselling real property collateral in order to recover unpaid loan balances is secondary to lenders' primary line of business.

In balance sheet terms, OREO assets are considered non-earning assets for purposes of regulatory accounting. In the context of national banks in the U.S., the term OREO is legally defined by the Office of the Comptroller of the Currency in regulations promulgated pursuant to 12 U.S.C. § 29, specifically in 12 CFR 34 and 12 CFR 160.30.

== Process ==
As soon as a property goes into a distressed status (the borrower/home owner misses mortgage payments) the beneficiary will want to determine the amount of equity that the property has. A popular method to determine the equity is to obtain a Broker's Price Opinion (BPO) or order an appraisal. Based on the amount of equity that is determined from the BPO, the bank will decide whether to allow a short sale (if requested by the homeowner). If no short sale is requested by the home owner, the beneficiary will continue the foreclosure process. If the beneficiary is unable to sell the property through a short sale or at a foreclosure auction it will now become an REO property.

After a repossession from which the property becomes classified as REO, the beneficiary will go through the process of trying to sell the property on its own or obtain the service of an REO Asset Manager. The beneficiary will remove the liens and other debts on the home and try to resell it to the public, either through future auctions, direct marketing through a real estate broker, or by itself. The asset manager may also try to contact REO realtors that specialize in certain ZIP codes to help sell this bank owned property. Real estate investors will often purchase these properties because of discounts offered to compensate for the condition of the property.

Many larger banks and government institutions have REO/asset management departments that field bids and offers, oversee up keep, and handle sales. Some REO properties on the open market will be listed in MLS by the broker who performed the BPO.

== Property preservation ==
Bank REO properties are generally in poor condition and need repairs and maintenance, both to satisfy property upkeep laws and to preserve and prepare the property for sale. Maintenance is generally the responsibility of the mortgage servicer and is often in turn provided by a specialized property preservation company. These property preservation services include: securing a property (changing locks, boarding up), debris removal, property maintenance (winterizing, cutting grass, repairing or tarping roof leaks), and rehabilitation.

In addition to preventing damage to the property, securing a property is used to prevent or discourage re-entry by former occupants or by squatters, which can both damage the property and require legal proceedings to remove, further complicating a sale. Swimming pools must also be secured to prevent deaths or injuries from drowning and falls.

Lenders may purchase "real estate owned" insurance to protect against loss and liability relating to lender-owned properties. REO insurance differs from "forced placed" insurance (also "lender placed" insurance), which a lender purchases for borrower-owned property when the borrower does not insure the property.

== Bulk real estate owned ==
Bulk REO or bulk real estate owned, from a real estate investor’s point of view, is like investing on wholesale real estate properties. On the other hand, banks or lenders sell or open their assets in group for auction at a very low price compared to their market value.

== See also ==
- Real estate business
- Real estate development
- Real estate economics
- Real estate bubble
