= EAccelerator =

PHP programming language tool

eAccelerator was a PHP accelerator derived from the MMCache extension for the PHP programming language. eAccelerator provides a bytecode cache. eAccelerator is open source and thereby free to use and distribute. Old and unmaintained versions also provided an encoder.

Every time a PHP script is accessed, PHP usually parses and compiles scripts to bytecode. Once installed, eAccelerator optimizes the compiled bytecode and caches this to shared memory or disk or both. Upon subsequent accesses to a script, eAccelerator will access cached bytecode if it is available instead of the script being compiled. This avoids the performance overhead of repeated parsing and compilation.

Previous eAccelerator versions also provided functions for use in PHP scripts that allow access to shared memory, automatic web (content) caching, and other related tasks. These were removed as of version 0.9.6rc1.

Old eAccelerator versions had an encoder component that creates a file that cannot be as easily read as a normal PHP script, offering some code protection. A dedicated extension named eLoader is available to process such encoded scripts if the eAccelerator extension is not desired. This functionality has been removed from the current developer version and will not be part of the next release.

No new version was released since Jan. 2010. The latest supported PHP version was 5.3, which had its end-of-life in 2014.

eAccelerator is free software released under the GNU GPL 2.0.

== See also ==
- Zend Performance Suite
- Alternative PHP Cache
