= Broker's price opinion =

Real estate selling price report

A broker's price opinion (BPO) is a report that is performed by a licensed real estate agent, broker, or appraiser. A BPO is an informal appraisal. It is similar to a CMA (Comparative Market Analysis), though the real estate professional is usually paid to prepare a BPO. A BPO can be either an exterior drive-by or a full interior report. When doing a BPO, the real estate professional researches the subject property, takes pictures of it, investigates the neighborhood, as well as retrieves six comparable properties (three Active Comps and three Sold Comps) in their MLS (Multiple Listing Service). The final BPO is used to support their professional opinion that will help determine the potential selling price or estimated value of a property.

== Involved parties ==
Broker price opinions are initiated by financial institutions. Examples are banks, mortgage companies, and loss mitigation companies.

The BPO is performed by a real estate professional who is acting on behalf of the financial institution. Such a professional could be a real estate agent, a real estate broker, an appraiser, or other qualified person. Through BPOs, real estate professionals can improve their skills in property inspection, market knowledge, evaluation, and property pricing. At a price of US$30–$100 per BPO, the work can provide side income or steady income for real estate agents. Agents may also create working relationships and a rapport with financial institutions. Some BPO agents work through a BPO company that provides a single point of contact to the client and oversight of agents and their reports.

== Uses of a BPO ==
A financial institution may order a BPO for:

- situations that do not require the expense or time of a full appraisal
- real estate owned (REO) properties
- pending foreclosures or foreclosured properties
- short sales
- an addition or a cross-check to an appraisal
- home equity loans or a home equity line of credit of less than $250,000
- refinancing
- appeal to cancel lender's mortgage insurance (LMI or PMI)
- due diligence by financial institutions
- asset evaluation and bookkeeping by financial institutions
- a selling or purchase price for an individual property or a portfolio of home loans (sometimes for thousands of loans)

== Overview of the BPO process ==
A real estate agent or a broker is hired to complete a BPO report on a property. A BPO may be occasionally requested without a fee in hopes that the financial institution, bank, or lender will receive a sales listing for the property.

The BPO professional then conducts the investigation. Many factors affect the price of a property:

- characteristics of the individual property, such as structure type, size, room use, age, lot size, and parking
- how the property fits into the immediate neighborhood
- compliance with local zoning requirements
- characteristics of the neighborhood
- values of similar properties in the surrounding area
- the amount of cleaning, repair, and preparation needed to make the property marketable
- BPO and comparative market analysis (CMA) can be provided by real estate brokers to establish a general idea of what a home could be listed for in the current real estate market.

The result is a brief report, usually two or three pages in length. This report includes analysis of the property and neighborhood, photographs, comparable properties ("comps"), and local and regional market information.

== Types of BPOs ==
A broker may do a drive-by BPO or an interior BPO. In drive-by BPOs, the professionals do not have access to the interior of the property; they rely on exterior appearance, neighborhood information, comparables, and other documentation. The interior BPO is more in-depth; it requires the agent to make contact with the borrower or point of contact (POC) to schedule an inspection, and when arriving the agent looks the property over and notes all repairs needed to bring the property to average condition fair market value (updates and upgrades are not allowed, unless the agent can show that the local market calls for updates or upgrades i.e. granite countertops stainless appliances and hardwood floors). A photo of the front, rear and both sides of exterior are taken, as well as a photo of each room of the interior, as well as all mechanicals and appliances. When completing the report, value is chosen for 30 day quicksale, and 60–90 day values, and a suggested list price for each is calculated based on market conditions and list to sale ratio for that market. The repaired fair market value is then reduced by itemized repair costs to find the as-is value.

== Comparison to other kinds of value analysis ==
Automated valuation model

In an automated valuation model (AVM), a computerized mathematical model evaluates basic features of the property, compares to area sales, and determines a rough value. The calculation takes into account information about property size, bedrooms, and bathrooms. An AVM is a basic evaluation – "just to make sure that the property value is in the right ball park" – and may be replaced by a full real estate appraisal. Because an AVM does not involve a site visit, it does not include factors such as condition or upgrades.

Comparative Market Analysis

An individual who is looking to sell or purchase a home might request that an agent perform a comparative market analysis (CMA) to determine a reasonable listing price or offering price. The process of deciding a CMA price is similar to a BPO. However, a BPO – whether the exterior drive-by BPO or the full interior BPO – is more thorough than most CMAs.

Real estate appraisal

Unlike a BPO professional, a real estate appraiser must be licensed or certified in most countries. A BPO is less thorough than an appraisal.

Only a licensed or certified appraiser can execute a valuation or an appraisal.

== See also ==
- BPO Standards and Guidelines
