= Httpd =

PC clients communicating via network with an HTTPd process serving static content only

HTTPd is a software program that usually runs in the background (i.e. a so-called "daemon"), as a process, and plays the role of a server in a client–server model using the HTTP and/or HTTPS network protocol(s).

The process waits for the incoming client requests and for each request it answers by replying with requested information, including the sending of the requested web resource, or with an HTTP error message.

HTTPd stands for Hypertext Transfer Protocol daemon.

It usually is the main software part of an HTTP server better known as a web server.

Some implementations are:

- Apache HTTP Server
- BusyBox httpd
- lighttpd HTTP server
- nginx HTTP and reverse proxy server
- OpenBSD's httpd (since OpenBSD 5.6)
- NCSA HTTPd
- Internet Information Services

== See also ==
- Web server
- Comparison of web server software
