= Lighttpd =

Web server

lighttpd
- Original author: Jan Kneschke
- Release: March 2003; 23 years ago
- Stable release: 1.4.85 / 8 July 2026; 2 months ago
- Preview release: 1.4.85 (July 8, 2026; 2 months ago) [±]
- Written in: C
- Available in: English
- Type: Web server
- License: BSD-3-Clause
- Website: www.lighttpd.net
- Repository: git.lighttpd.net/lighttpd

lighttpd (prescribed pronunciation: "lighty") is an open-source web server optimized for speed-critical environments. It was originally written by Jan Kneschke as a proof-of-concept of the c10k problem – how to handle 10,000 connections in parallel on one server, but has gained worldwide popularity. Its name is a portmanteau of "light" and "httpd".

== Premise ==
The low memory footprint (compared to other web servers), small CPU load and speed optimizations make lighttpd suitable for servers that are suffering load problems, or for serving static media separately from dynamic content. lighttpd is free and open-source software and is distributed under the BSD license. It runs natively on Unix-like operating systems, with experimental support for Microsoft Windows.

== Application support ==
lighttpd supports the FastCGI, SCGI and CGI interfaces to external programs, allowing web applications written in any programming language to be used with the server. As a particularly popular language, PHP performance has received special attention. lighttpd's FastCGI can be configured to support PHP with opcode caches (like APC) properly and efficiently. Additionally, it has received attention from its popularity within the Python, Perl, Ruby and Lua communities. lighttpd also supports WebDNA, the resilient in-memory database system designed to build database-driven websites. It is a popular web server for the Catalyst and Ruby on Rails web frameworks. lighttpd does not support ISAPI.

== Features ==
- Load balancing, CGI, FastCGI, SCGI, HTTP proxy, Servlet AJP, WebSocket tunnel support
- chroot support
- Web server event mechanism performance – select(), poll(), and epoll()
- Support for more efficient event notification schemes like kqueue and epoll
- Conditional URL rewriting (mod_rewrite)
- TLS/SSL with SNI support, via OpenSSL, GnuTLS, Mbed TLS, NSS, WolfSSL.
- Authentication against an LDAP or DBI server
- RRDtool statistics
- Rule-based downloading with possibility of a script handling only authentication
- Server Side Includes support (but not server-side CGI from SSI)
- Flexible virtual hosting
- Modules support
- Lua programming language scripts via mod_magnet
- WebDAV support
- HTTP compression using mod_deflate (zlib, brotli, zstd)
- Light-weight (less than 1 MB)
- Single-process design with only several threads. No processes or threads started per connection.
- HTTP/2 support since lighttpd 1.4.56
- HTTP/2 WebSocket support since lighttpd 1.4.65
- TLS Encrypted Client Hello (ECH) support since lighttpd 1.4.77

== Limitations ==
- Versions below 1.4.40 do not officially support sending large files from CGI, FastCGI, or proxies unless X-Sendfile is used. This limitation has been removed in lighttpd 1.4.40.
- No HTTP/3 support

== Usage ==
lighttpd was used in the past by several high-traffic websites, including Bloglines, xkcd, Meebo, and YouTube. The Wikimedia Foundation also once ran lighttpd servers. Due to relatively small size it's often used in embedded devices like GL.iNet and Turris Omnia.

It's also used by git as a HTTP server daemon.

== See also ==
- Comparison of web server software
- Internet Cache Protocol
- Proxy server which discusses client-side proxies
- Reverse proxy which discusses origin-side proxies
- Traffic Server
- Web accelerator which discusses host-based HTTP acceleration
