= Boa (web server) =

- Original author: Paul Phillips
- Developers: Larry Doolittle and Jon Nelson
- Release: circa 1995; 31 years ago
- Final release: 0.94.13 / 30 July 2002; 24 years ago
- Preview release: 0.94.14rc21 / 23 February 2005; 21 years ago
- Operating system: Cross-platform
- Available in: C
- Type: Web server
- License: GPLv2
- Website: www.boa.org

Boa is an unmaintained since 2005 open-source small-footprint web server that is suitable for embedded applications. Originally written by Paul Phillips, it was previously maintained by Larry Doolittle and Jon Nelson.

Slashdot and Fotolog use Boa to serve images.

As of its last release, Boa has the following limitations:

- No access control features (HTTP Basic access authentication, etc.)
- No chroot option (planned)
- No Server Side Includes (deemed incompatible with server performance goals)
- No SSL support although there are some patches against 0.94.13 that introduce SSL support

As of 2022 Boa is still used in many embedded applications, and its known vulnerabilities have been actively exploited. In 2022, Microsoft researchers found that cyberattacks on the electrical grid in northern India exploited a vulnerability in the Boa web server.

== See also ==
- Comparison of web servers
