= Helicon Ape =

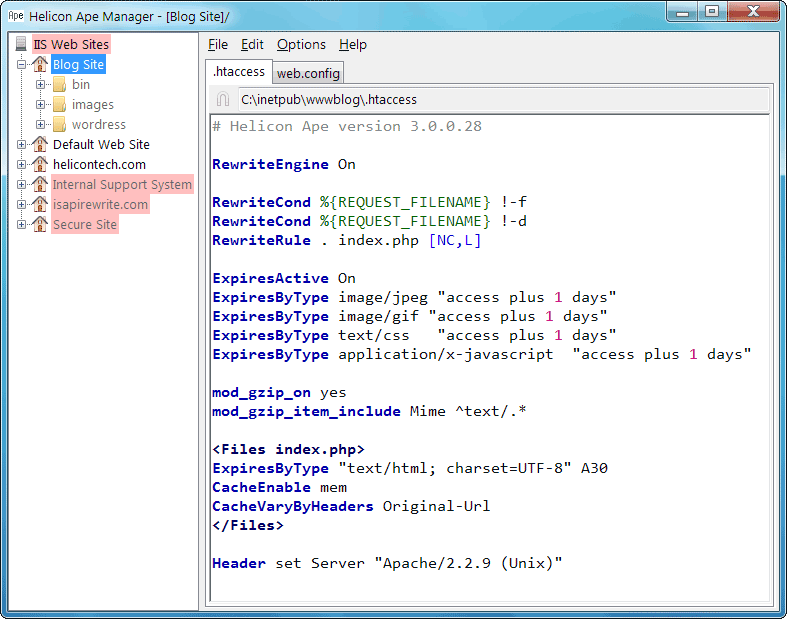
- Helicon Ape Manager
- Developer: Helicon Tech
- Stable release: 3.0.0.56 / 22 November 2010
- Operating system: Microsoft Windows
- Type: Web server
- License: Proprietary
- Website: http://www.helicontech.com/ape/

Helicon Ape is a piece of software developed by Helicon Tech that brings Apache functionality to IIS web servers. It executes as an ASP.NET module for IIS 7 (and higher versions), integrating the functionalities of over 35 Apache modules.

Helicon Ape uses a graphical user interface for configuration and browsing. It also includes a regular expressions tester and a password generator. Helicon Ape provides proprietary modules for server-side debugging and profiling (mod_developer), SEO optimization (mod_linkfreeze), and hotlinking protection (mod_hotlink).

== Modules ==
Below is a table of modules currently supported in Helicon Ape:

Helicon Ape modules
Module	Purpose
mod_antibot	Provides HTTP frequency analyzing and DDoS protection tool.
mod_asis	Send files that contain their own HTTP headers.
mod_auth_basic	Enables HTTP Basic Authentication.
mod_auth_digest	Enables MD5 Digest Authentication.
mod_authn_anon	Configure anonymous users access to authenticated areas.
mod_authn_dbd	Provides authentication based on look-up in a SQL database.
mod_authn_default	Reject any authorization request if no authentication is configured.
mod_authn_file	Provide authentication based on user look-up in plain text password file.
mod_authz_default	Reject any authorization request if no authentication is configured.
mod_authz_groupfile	Allows or denies access to particular areas of the site depending on user group membership.
mod_authz_host	Allows access control to parts of the web server based on hostname, IP address or other characteristics of the client request.
mod_authz_user	Allows or denies access to portions of the web server for authenticated users.
mod_cache	Allows caching local or proxied content.
mod_core	Provides the use of Helicon Ape core features.
mod_dbd	Allows for the management of SQL database connections.
mod_deflate	Enables server output compression.
mod_developer	Allows for the debugging of web requests.
mod_disk_cache	Allows for the use of a disk-based storage engine for mod_cache.
mod_env	Controls the environment provided to CGI scripts and SSI pages.
mod_evasive	Allows for the protection of sites from HTTP DoS/DDoS and brute-force attacks.
mod-expires	Sets the Expires HTTP header and max-age directive of the Cache-Control HTTP header in server responses in relation to either the time the source file was last modified, or to the time of the client access.
mod_filter	Enables the use of context-sensitive content filters.
mod_gzip	Allows for the compression of HTTP responses.
mod_headers	Modifies HTTP request/response headers.
mod_hotlink	Protects content from hotlinking.
mod_linkfreeze	Changes links on pages to an SEO-friendly format.
mod_log_config	Enables custom logging.
mod_logio	Logs the number of bytes sent/received per request.
mod_mem_cache	Enables the use of a memory-based storage engine for mod_cache.
mod_mime	Associates filename extensions with behavior (handlers and filters) and content (MIME-type, language, character set and encoding).
mod_proxy	Applies forward and reverse proxy functions.
mod_replace	Allows for the editing of HTML body and HTTP request/response headers.
mod_rewrite	Rewrites requested URLs on the fly based on regular expression rules and various conditions.
mod_seo	Allows for the creation of SEO-friendly links on pages based on database or mapfile values.
mod_setenvif	Sets environment variables depending on whether different parts of the request match specified regular expressions.
mod_so	Emulates the functions of loading modules.
mod_spelling	Corrects misspelled URLs by performing case-insensitive checks and allowing one misspelling.
mod_usertrack	Tracks and logs user activity on the site using cookies.
mod_xsendfile	Sends the file specified by the X-SENDFILE header.

== Compatibility ==
Helicon Ape was designed for IIS 7 and higher (Windows Vista, Windows Server 2008, Windows 7, and Windows Server 2008 R2). While it can operate on IIS6 (Windows Server 2003), its functionality is slightly limited.

== License ==
There are three license types available for Helicon Ape:

- Free – for up to 3 sites; costs nothing.
- Per-site – for one extra site; costs $25.
- Server – for an unlimited number of sites; costs $95; includes a 45-day trial period.

== See also ==
- Apache HTTP Server
- Comparison of web server software
- Internet Information Services
- URL redirection
