= Xitami =

Open-source web and FTP server

- Developer: iMatix Corporation
- Release: 1996; 30 years ago
- Final release: 2.5c2 / 24 July 2002; 24 years ago
- Preview release: 5.0a0 / 18 February 2009; 17 years ago
- Operating system: Cross-platform
- Type: Web server
- License: BSD-like, MPL2.0
- Website: imatix-legacy.github.io

Xitami is a Web and FTP server, originally developed by iMatix Corporation as a free, open-source product from 1996 to 2000. It ran as a single process with a small footprint. It supported several web application protocols and was very portable. It also had a web interface to configure the web/FTP server.

In 2009, iMatix launched a new version of Xitami, called X5 (Xitami/5).

== iMatix, developer of Xitami ==
iMatix is a firm that produced free software applications, such as the ZeroMQ high performance message library, the OpenAMQ AMQP messaging service, Libero, the GSL code generator. Hintjens was CEO and chief software designer for it.

== History ==
iMatix started the original Xitami server in 1996 as a demonstration of its "SMT" multithreading technology for building protocol servers. The name was chosen at the last minute when the developers realized that their original choice ("Cosmos") had already been taken by another web server that no longer exists. "Xitami" is "iMatix" spelled backwards.

Xitami was featured in an April 1997 article in Dr. Dobb's Journal. The web server attracted people looking for a fast but simple web/FTP server, mainly on Microsoft Windows.

Xitami was designed to be portable, and was ported to Windows, Linux and other Unices, OpenVMS, BeOS, and OS/2. All non-portable functionality was encapsulated in a library layer called SFL (the "standard function library"). SFL was a free and open source project and was used fairly widely in other such projects. In 1999, the Apache web server adopted a similar approach to portability for Apache2, building the Apache Portable Runtime (APR).

The Xitami team continued to add features until mid-2000 when development of the server stopped except for security updates. In 2008 multiple printf vulnerabilities were reported in the final release of Xitami/2.5.

== X5 ==
In January 2009 iMatix announced the start of a new Xitami project, version 5, called X5. This uses the latest generation of iMatix's multithreading technology (Base2), making Xitami scalable to multiple cores, while remaining small, and simple. iMatix has stated that it is "designed to handle thousands of connections without difficulty" which makes it ready for long polling, in which client connections remain open for extended durations. Windows binaries for X5 were released in February 2009 and X5 was used for the first time to run the iMatix Live Zyre website. X5 shares the same technical framework as iMatix's OpenAMQ message service.

X5 is written in ANSI C99, using a meta-programming approach called "Model Oriented Programming". X5 was presented at FOSDEM 2009 as consisting of 3,457 lines of meta-meta code. X5 uses APR in place of SFL, and has been run on Windows, Linux, AIX, Solaris, and OpenVMS.

== See also ==
- Comparison of web servers
- ØMQ
