= Tervela =

- Company type: Private
- Founded: 1 January 2004
- Headquarters: New York City, United States
- Website: www.tervela.com

Tervela Inc. is a privately held American information technology company based in Boston, Massachusetts, and New York City, New York, United States, founded in 2004 that provides information technology related services across the United States.

== History ==
Tervela has been focused on providing hardware and virtual solutions for organizations to manage their infrastructure in coordination with cloud services. The company introduced a hardware-accelerated messaging system and expanded its offerings from 2009 to 2011, including a set of virtual appliances compatible with hardware-accelerated appliances.

As the growth of cloud services and content collaboration platforms began to accelerate, in 2015 Tervela started offering several cloud based services to help the organizations migrating the data and user content from on-premises servers to cloud servers.

Here are some of the key events in Tervela's history:

- 2004: Tervela was founded in 2004 and raised $20 million in its third funding round.
- 2007: Tervela introduces the first hardware-accelerated messaging switch.
- 2009: Tervela introduces several products that allow scalable middleware to deliver messages incrementally scalable well into the millions of messages per second.
- 2011: Tervela introduces a set of virtual appliances compatible with hardware-accelerated appliances.
- 2012: Tervela is named one of the "100 Hottest Companies in America" by Red Herring magazine.
- 2013: Tervela is named one of the "Cool Vendors" in the "Data Integration and Governance" category by Gartner.

Tervela is a privately held company, so its financial information is not publicly available. However, the company has raised over $60 million in funding from investors.

Tervela has a team of over 100 employees. The company is headquartered in Boston, Massachusetts, with offices in New York City, New York, United States.
