= Mongoose (web server) =

Slim webserver, webserver library

- Original author: Sergey Lyubka
- Developer: Cesanta Software Limited
- Stable release: 7.21 / 1 April 2026; 2 months ago
- Written in: C
- Operating system: Cross-platform
- Type: Web server
- License: Dual license: GPLv2 and commercial license
- Website: mongoose.ws
- Repository: github.com/cesanta/mongoose

Mongoose is a cross-platform embedded web server and networking library for C and C++.

The small footprint of the software enables any Internet-connected device to function as a web server.

== Overview ==
Mongoose is built on top of the Mongoose Embedded Library which may be used inside of embedded devices. Mongoose is officially supported on Windows, MacOS, Linux, QNX, eCOS, FreeRTOS, Android and iOS.
