= Pieter Hintjens =

Belgian CEO, software developer, author (1962-2016)

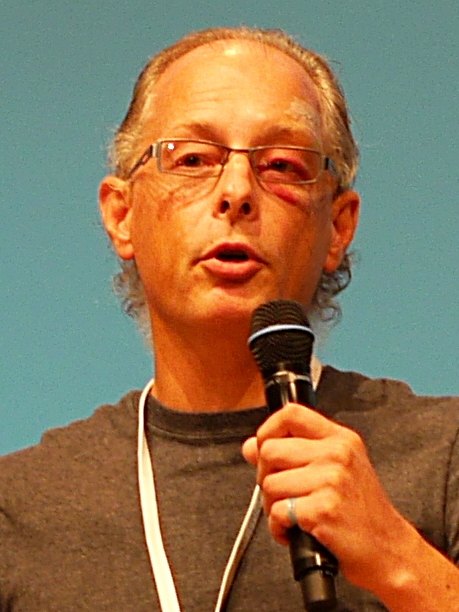
- Hintjens in 2014
- Born: 3 December 1962; Congo-Léopoldville
- Died: 4 October 2016 (aged 53); Brussels, Belgium
- Occupations: CEO, software developer, author
- Website: hintjens.com

Pieter Hintjens (3 December 1962 – 4 October 2016) was a Belgian software developer, author, and past president of the Foundation for a Free Information Infrastructure (FFII), an association that fights against software patents. In 2007, he was nominated one of the "50 most influential people in IP" by Managing Intellectual Property magazine.

== Biography ==
Hintjens was born in Congo in 1962 and grew up in East Africa.

Hintjens served as CEO and chief software designer for iMatix, a firm that produced free software applications, such as the ZeroMQ high performance message library, the OpenAMQ AMQP messaging service, Libero, the GSL code generator, and the Xitami web server.

He was active in open standards development, being the author of the original Advanced Message Queuing Protocol (AMQP), a founder of the Digital Standards Organization, and the editor of the RestMS web messaging protocol. RestMS is developed using a peer-to-peer, share-alike, branch and merge model (COSS) developed by Hintjens and others for the Digital Standards Organization in 2008.

He was CEO of Wikidot Inc., a wikifarm, until February 2010.

In 2010, Hintjens was diagnosed with bile duct cancer, which was successfully surgically removed. However, in April 2016, his cancer returned, and was determined to be terminal. Hintjens died of voluntary euthanasia on 4 October 2016.

== ZeroMQ ==
While in his position as iMatix CEO, Hintjens founded the ZeroMQ software project together with Martin Sustrik. ZeroMQ is a high-performance asynchronous messaging library aimed at use in scalable distributed or concurrent applications.

In November 2013, Hintjens announced EdgeNet, a project building upon ZeroMQ for mesh networks. EdgeNet aims to build a secure, anonymous peer-to-peer alternative to the internet. Hintjens also authored several ZeroMQ projects, such as CZMQ, zproto, and Malamute.

== Views ==
In October 2007, Hintjens warned that after mortgages and consumer debt, patents were a third economic bubble waiting to damage the global economy, writing: "House prices fall and bad debt shakes the financial markets across the US and Europe. Bankers look nervously at their portfolios of consumer debt and mortgages. But some analysts say that it's patents, not houses or loans, that will tip the global financial market into crisis".

== Bibliography ==
- "Confessions of a Necromancer", 2016
- "Social Architecture", 2016
- "The Psychopath Code", 2015
- "ZeroMQ: Messaging for Many Applications", O'Reilly Media, 2013
- "Culture and Empire: Digital Revolution", 2013
- "Code Connected Volume 1", 2013
- "Scalable C", unfinished
- "A protocol for dying", 2016
