= Transaction Workflow Innovation Standards Team =

Transaction Workflow Innovation Standards Team (Twist) is a not-for-profit industry standards group. It does not charge anything for involvement. The main goal of Twist is to create non-proprietary XML message standards for the financial services industry. To this end it provides a message format validation service.

Its focus on financial transaction processing covers the aspects of:

- Payments and collections (on invoices to suppliers and from customers)
- Cash management (cash flow, position keeping across accounts and timing)
- Working capital finance (short term investment of spare cash to make gains)
- Wholesale financial market access (raising capital through stocks and bonds)

The focus of these combined standards is to create and improve straight-through processing (STP). As any STP system of systems will invariably involve many market participants such standards are essential for success. Twist provides a check-list for ensuring STP is implemented in accordance with its standards. The word ‘standards’ is used rather than protocols as Twist endeavours to also define business process best practices. Such practices are typically implemented in a workflow, or business process management system (BPMS). Considerable emphasis is placed on how to handle exceptions so that as much traffic can be handled automatically with as little as possible going to manual intervention. One major standard introduced by TWIST is the Bank Services Billing Standard (BSB).

== Parties involved ==
The leading participant in Twist is Royal Dutch Shell's corporate treasury department, giving the Twist standards a corporate finance perspective rather than a banking one. Participants in Twist are drawn from across the broader banking supply chain and its support industries. A common role for Twist is to channel corporate treasury expertise to software vendors to help them develop the required products. Twist has been adopted in the United Kingdom, Singapore, and the Netherlands, with particular use in the foreign exchange (FX), fixed income (FI), and money markets (MM) asset classes.

== Related standards ==
Related XML financial services standard include FIX, FpML and SWIFT XML. Where related financial services message standards exist, such as these XML standards or classic SWIFT, then Twist aims to leverage them and interoperate with them rather than compete. Reuters is working with Twist, as of May 2005, to tie into its FX trading service (known as the RTFX service). Their aim is to deliver real time trade confirmations directly into corporate treasurer’s STP systems.
