= Comparison of web server software =

Web server software allows computers to act as web servers. The first web servers supported only static files, such as HTML (and images), but now they commonly allow embedding of server side applications.

Some web application frameworks include simple HTTP servers. For example the Django framework provides runserver, and PHP has a built-in server. These are generally intended only for use during initial development. A production server will require a more robust HTTP front-end such as one of the servers listed here.

== Overview ==
Server	Developed by	Software license	Last stable version	Latest release date
AOLserver	NaviSoft	Mozilla	4.5.1	February 2, 2009 (discontinued)
Apache HTTP Server	Apache Software Foundation	Apache	2.4.70	November 6, 2026
Apache Tomcat	Apache Software Foundation	Apache	11.0.27	October 12, 2026
Boa	Jon Nelson and Larry Doolittle	GNU GPL	0.94.13	July 30, 2002 (discontinued)
BusyBox httpd	Glenn Engel, Vladimir Oleynik, BusyBox Team	GNU GPL	1.36.1	May 19, 2023
Caddy	Matt Holt	Apache	2.11.9	November 5, 2026
Caudium	The Caudium Group	GNU GPL	1.4.18	April 12, 2012
CERN httpd	CERN, W3C, Tim Berners-Lee, Ari Luotonen and Henrik Frystyk Nielsen	MIT Copyright Statement with acknowledgement to CERN	3.0A	July 15, 1996 (discontinued)
Cherokee HTTP Server	Álvaro López Ortega	GNU GPL	1.2.104	April 1, 2014
GlassFish	Sun Microsystems, Oracle Corporation, since 2019 Eclipse Foundation	Eclipse Public License & GNU General Public License	8.0.5	October 4, 2026
Hiawatha	Hugo Leisink	GNU GPLv2	12.3	July 26, 2026
HFS	Rejetto	GNU GPL	3.1.7	May 28, 2026
IBM HTTP Server	IBM	Non-free proprietary	9.0.5.17	September 19, 2023
Internet Information Services	Microsoft	Non-free proprietary	10.0 v1809	October 2, 2018
Jetty	Eclipse Foundation	Apache	12.1.14	October 5, 2026
Jexus	Bing Liu	Non-free proprietary	6.2.x	2020
lighttpd	Jan Kneschke (Incremental)	BSD variant	1.4.85	July 8, 2026
LiteSpeed Web Server	LiteSpeed Technologies	GNU GPLv3 / proprietary license	6.3.5	March 14, 2026
Mongoose	Cesanta Software	GNU GPLv2 / proprietary license	7.23	August 12, 2026
Monkey HTTP Server	Monkey Software	Apache	1.8.7	April 14, 2026
NaviServer	Various	Mozilla 1.1	5.0.5	May 28, 2026
NCSA HTTPd	Robert McCool	Non-free proprietary	1.5.2a	October 8, 1996 (discontinued)
nginx	NGINX, Inc.	BSD variant	1.31.8	October 21, 2026
OpenBSD httpd	Reyk Floeter	ISC	8.0	October 20, 2026
OpenLink Virtuoso	OpenLink Software	GNU GPL and proprietary versions	7.2.17	May 7, 2026
Oracle HTTP Server	Oracle Corporation	Non-free proprietary	14c (14.1.2.0.0)	June 2025
Oracle iPlanet Web Server	Oracle Corporation	BSD	7.0.27	October 1, 2017
Oracle WebLogic Server	Oracle Corporation (formerly BEA Systems)	Non-free proprietary	15c (15.1.1.0.0)	December 1, 2025
Resin Open Source	Caucho Technology	GNU GPLv3 / proprietary license	4.0.67	November 20, 2024
Resin Professional	Caucho Technology	Non-free proprietary	4.0.67	November 20, 2024
Tengine	Taobao (Alibaba Group)	BSD	3.1.0	October 27, 2023
thttpd	Jef Poskanzer for ACME Laboratories	BSD variant	2.29	May 23, 2018
TUX web server	Ingo Molnár	GNU GPL	3.2.6.18	September 20, 2006 (discontinued)
WEBrick	Ruby Community	BSD 2-clause	1.9.2	November 26, 2025
Xitami	iMatix Corporation	BSD	2.5c2	July 24, 2002 (discontinued)
Yaws	Claes Wikström	BSD 3 clause	2.3.1	May 29, 2026
Zeus Web Server	Zeus Technology	Non-free proprietary	4.3r5	January 13, 2010 (discontinued)
Zope	Zope Corporation	Zope	6.1	April 22, 2026
Server	Developed by	Software license	Last stable version	Latest release date

== Features ==
Some features may be intentionally not included in a web server to avoid featuritis. For example:

- TLS/HTTPS may be enabled with a separate stunnel daemon that terminates TLS and redirects raw HTTP packets to an http daemon.
- NGINX and OpenBSD httpd authors decided not to include CGI interpretation, instead using FastCGI. For OpenBSD, a slowcgi gateway was developed.
- BusyBox httpd doesn't have automatically generated directory listing but it may be implemented as a CGI script.

Server	Security			Virtual hosting	Dynamic content (Note: The "dynamic content" columns indicate whether the server itself implements the given feature. Other features may be available by delegation (e.g. Apache HTTP Server can delegate to Apache Tomcat for Servlet support).)								Runs in user or kernel space	Administration console	Additional protocol support			
Server	Basic access authenti- cation	Digest access authenti- cation	SSL/TLS https	Virtual hosting	CGI	FCGI	SCGI	WSGI	Java Servlets	SSI	ISAPI	SSJS	Runs in user or kernel space	Administration console	IPv6	HTTP/2	QUIC	HTTP/3
AOLserver	Yes	No	Yes (Note: support for using RSA BSAFE) (Note: support for using openSSL) (Note: support for using Network Security Services)	Yes	Yes	No	Unknown	No	No	Yes	Unknown	Unknown	user	Unknown	Unknown	Unknown	Unknown	Unknown
Apache HTTP Server	Yes	Yes	Yes (Note: via modules) (Note: support for using GnuTLS)	Yes	Yes	Yes	Yes	Yes	No (Note: This server implements AJP; compatible third-party Servlet containers can be integrated to provide seamless Servlet support.)	Yes	Yes (Note: This server can use the mod_isapi module for this support.)	Unknown	user	Yes (Note: via Geronimo)	Yes	Yes	No	No
Apache Tomcat	Yes	Yes	Yes (Note: support for using Java Secure Socket Extension)	Yes	Yes	No	Unknown	No	Yes	Yes	No (Note: While Tomcat does not implement ISAPI directly, it integrates well with Apache mod_jk which contains an ISAPI module for this purpose.)	Unknown	user	Yes	Yes (Note: Requires a JVM and OS that support IPv6.)	Yes	Unknown	Unknown
Boa	No	No	Yes (Note: with external patch)	Yes	Yes	No	Unknown	No	No	No	No	No	user	Unknown	Yes	No	No	No
BusyBox httpd	Yes	No	No	No	Yes	No	No	No	No	No (Note: Implemented as CGI script httpd_ssi)	No	No	user	No	Yes	No	No	No
Caddy	Yes	No	Yes	Yes	Partial (Note: CGI implemented for WebSocket connections)	Yes	No	No	No	No (Note: Same capabilities as SSI available with templates)	No	No	user	No	Yes	Yes	Yes	Yes (Note: The experimental_http3 option "enables experimental draft HTTP/3 support...This option will go away in the future".)
Caucho Resin Server	Yes	Yes	paid version	Yes	Yes	Yes	Unknown	No	Yes	Yes	No	Unknown	user	Yes	Yes	Unknown	Unknown	Unknown
Caudium	Yes	Yes	Yes	Yes	Yes	Yes	Unknown	No	Yes	Yes	Unknown	Unknown	user	Yes	Yes (Note: Version 1.4.8 of Caudium mentions IPv6 support but this is not explicitly specified on the official website. Maintainers have been sent a Documentation Update Query; please remove this warning notice when they update their website)	Unknown	Unknown	Unknown
Cherokee HTTP Server	Yes	Yes	Yes	Yes	Yes	Yes	Yes	Yes	No	Yes	No	Unknown	user	Yes	Yes	Unknown	Unknown	Unknown
HFS	Yes	No	No	No	No	No	Unknown	No	No	No	Unknown	Unknown	user	Unknown	No	Unknown	Unknown	Unknown
Hiawatha HTTP Server	Yes	Yes	Yes (Note: support for using PolarSSL)	Yes	Yes	Yes	No	No	No	Yes	No	Unknown	user	Yes	Yes	Yes	No	No
IBM HTTP Server	Yes	Yes	Yes	Yes	Yes	Yes	Unknown	No	No	Yes	No	Unknown	user	Yes	Yes	Unknown	Unknown	Unknown
Internet Information Services	Yes	Yes	Yes	Yes	Yes	Yes	Yes	No	No (Note: Servlet Engines are supported via isapi_redirect.)	Yes	Yes	Yes	kernel and user	Yes	Yes	Yes	Unknown	Unknown
Jetty	Yes	Yes	Yes	Yes	Yes	Unknown	Unknown	No	Yes	Unknown	Unknown	Yes	user	Unknown	Unknown	Yes	Unknown	Unknown
Jexus	No	No	Yes	Yes	No	Yes	No	No	No	No	No	Yes	user	Yes	No	Unknown	Unknown	Unknown
lighttpd	Yes	Yes	Yes	Yes	Yes	Yes	Yes	Yes	No	Yes	No	No	user	No	Yes	Yes	No	No
LiteSpeed Web Server	Yes	Yes	Yes	Yes	Yes	Yes	No	Yes	No	Yes	No	Unknown	user	Yes	Yes	Yes	Yes	Yes
Mongoose	Yes	Yes	Yes	Yes	Yes	No	No	No	No	Yes	No	No	user	Yes	Yes	Unknown	Unknown	Unknown
Monkey HTTP Server	Yes	No	Yes	Yes	Yes	Yes	No	No	No	No	No	No	user	No	Yes	Unknown	Unknown	Unknown
NaviServer	Yes	No	Yes	Yes	Yes	No	Unknown	No	No	Yes	Unknown	Unknown	user	Yes	Yes	Unknown	Unknown	Unknown
NCSA HTTPd	Yes	Yes	Unknown	Partial (Note: Due to lack of support for HTTP/1.1, name based virtual hosts are not fully implemented.)	Yes	Unknown	Unknown	No	No	Yes	No	No	user	No	No	No	No	No
nginx	Yes	Yes (module)	Yes	Yes	No	Yes	Yes	Yes	No	Yes	No	Unknown	user	No	Yes	Yes	Yes	Yes
OpenBSD httpd	Yes	No	Yes	Yes	No	Yes	No	No	No	No	No	No	user	No	Yes	No	No	No
OpenLink Virtuoso	Yes	Yes	Yes	Yes	No	No	No	No	Yes	Yes	No	No	user	Yes	No	No	Unknown	Unknown
Oracle HTTP Server	Yes	Yes	Yes	Yes	Yes	Yes	Unknown	No	No	Yes	No	Unknown	user	Yes (Note: via Enterprise Manager)	Yes	Unknown	Unknown	Unknown
Oracle iPlanet Web Server	Yes	Yes	Yes	Yes	Yes	Yes	Unknown	No	Yes	Yes	No	Yes	user	Yes	Yes	Unknown	Unknown	Unknown
thttpd	Yes	Unknown	No	Yes	Yes	No	Unknown	No	No	No	No	Unknown	user	No	Yes	Unknown	Unknown	Unknown
TUX web server	No	No	No	Yes	Yes	No	Unknown	No	No	No	No	Unknown	kernel	Unknown	Unknown	Unknown	Unknown	Unknown
Xitami	Yes	Unknown	paid version	Yes	Yes	Unknown	Unknown	No	Unknown	Yes	Unknown	Unknown	user	Unknown	Unknown	Unknown	Unknown	Unknown
Yaws	Yes	Unknown	Yes	Yes	Yes	Yes	Unknown	No	No	Yes	No	Unknown	user	Unknown	Yes	Unknown	Unknown	Unknown
Zeus Web Server	Yes	Yes	Yes	Yes	Yes	Yes	Unknown	No	No	Yes	Yes	Unknown	user	Yes	No	Unknown	Unknown	Unknown

== Operating system support ==
Server	Windows	Linux	macOS	BSD	Solaris	eComStation	OpenVMS	AIX	IBM i	z/OS	HP-UX
AOLserver	No	Yes	Yes	Yes	Yes	No	No	Unknown	No	Unknown	Unknown
Apache HTTP Server	Yes	Yes	Yes	Yes	Yes	Yes	Yes	Yes	Yes	Yes	Yes
Apache Tomcat	Yes	Yes	Yes	Yes	Yes	No	Yes	Yes	Yes	Yes	Yes
Boa	Unknown	Yes	Yes	Yes	Unknown	No	No	Unknown	No	Unknown	Unknown
BusyBox httpd	No	Yes	Unknown	Yes	No	No	No	No	No	No	No
Caddy	Yes	Yes	Yes	Yes	Yes	No	No	Unknown	Unknown	Unknown	Unknown
Caucho Resin Server	Yes	Yes	Yes	Yes	Yes	Yes	Yes	Yes	Yes	Yes	Yes
Caudium	No	Yes	Yes	Yes	Yes	No	No	Yes	No	Unknown	Unknown
Cherokee HTTP Server	No	Yes	Yes	Yes	Yes	No	No	Unknown	No	Unknown	Unknown
HFS	Yes	Yes	Yes	Yes	No	No	No	No	No	No	No
Hiawatha	with Cygwin	Yes	Yes	Yes	Yes	No	No	No	No	No	No
IBM HTTP Server	Yes	Yes	No	No	Yes	No	No	Yes	Yes	Yes	Yes
Internet Information Services	Yes	No	No	No	No	No	No	No	No	No	No
Jetty	Yes	Yes	Yes	Yes	Yes	Yes	No	Unknown	No	Yes	Unknown
Jexus	No	Yes	No	Yes	Unknown	No	No	No	No	No	No
lighttpd	Yes	Yes	Yes	Yes	Yes	No	No	Yes	No	No	Yes
LiteSpeed Web Server	No	Yes	Yes	Yes	Yes	No	No	Unknown	No	Unknown	Unknown
Mongoose	Yes	Yes	Yes	Yes	Yes	No	Yes	Yes	Yes	No	Yes
Monkey HTTP Server	No	Yes	Yes	No	No	No	No	No	No	No	No
NaviServer	Yes	Yes	Yes	Yes	Yes	Unknown	Unknown	Yes	No	Unknown	Unknown
NCSA HTTPd	Unknown	Yes	No	Yes	Yes	Yes	No	Unknown	No	Unknown	Yes
nginx	Yes	Yes	Yes	Yes	Yes	No	No	Yes	No	No	Yes
OpenLink Virtuoso	Yes	Yes	Yes	Yes	Yes	No	No	Yes	No	No	Yes
Oracle HTTP Server	Yes	Yes	No	Unknown	Yes	No	No	Yes	No	Unknown	Unknown
Oracle iPlanet Web Server	Yes	Yes	No	No	Yes	No	No	Yes	No	No	Yes
thttpd	Yes (Cygwin)	Yes	Yes	Yes	Yes	No	No	Unknown	No	Unknown	Unknown
TUX web server	No	Yes	No	No	No	No	No	No	No	No	No
Xitami	Yes	Yes	Yes	Yes	Yes	Yes	Yes	Yes	No	Unknown	Yes
Yaws	Yes	Yes	Yes	Yes	Yes	No	No	Yes	No	Unknown	Unknown

== See also ==
- Comparison of application servers
- Embedded HTTP server
- Gunicorn (HTTP server)
- Helicon Ape
