= Bank Services Billing Standard =

Industry standard for electronic bank billing statements

Bank Services Billing (BSB) is an industry standard that governs the format of electronic bills sent by financial institutions to wholesale customers such as corporations, governments, and institutions. A BSB statement reports on a corporate customer's usage of financial services and the related charges. It takes the form of a periodic electronic statement listing all chargeable service events that occurred during a reporting cycle, along with detailed tax and currency information. The standard was developed by TWIST, a not-for-profit industry group that develops open, XML-based standards for financial processes. Its stated aim is to enable corporations to obtain electronic billing statements from international banks in a standard format.

== Background ==
The standard was developed to address difficulties faced by large multinational corporations in monitoring what they pay international banks for services. Before its introduction, corporations often had no accurate way to verify international bank fees, analysis of fees was labor-intensive, and there was no consistent method of providing management with global banking relationship metrics. International cash management fees were typically decentralised with few controls in place, which also raised compliance concerns under regulations such as the Sarbanes–Oxley Act.

== Adoption ==
According to TWIST, Danske Bank of Denmark became the first European bank to use the standard, adopting it to deliver detailed billing information to corporate treasurers and wholesale clients. The bank used the TWIST BSB standard for the electronic transmission of bank charge information to General Electric.
