= BPO standards and guidelines =

Commonly accepted standards and the best practices for broker price opinion (BPO) experts

The Broker's Price Opinion Standards and Guidelines (BPOSG) are an accumulation of commonly accepted standards and the best practices for broker price opinion (BPO) experts such as real estate agents and brokers in the United States. These standards are maintained by BPO Standards Board (BSB).

A broker's price opinion is a procedure that develops a two or three-page report containing the estimated value of the property after a real estate agent or broker, following the broker's price opinion standards and guidelines, inspects the property and neighborhood.

They are mostly ordered by institutions to get a quick value on a parcel of real estate, like the lender that holds the mortgage on the property. BPOSG has been drafted by the subject matter experts throughout the BPO and valuation industry. And, it is facilitated in the United States by the National Association of Broker Price Opinion Professionals (NABPOP).

== History ==
These standards and guidelines were created in 2008 by a group of competitors in the real estate industry to bring a commonly accepted set of standards and guidelines.

=== Significance of these Standards and Guidelines ===
The BPOSG are employed to decide the possible selling price of real estate properties. Before their creation, a set of commonly accepted standards and guidelines for the real estate industry did not exist. The BSB and the NABPOP came together to create a uniform, standardized system which combined the best techniques, processes, and methods of real estate price evaluations. The created standards and guidelines have been recognized and accepted throughout the real estate industry.

=== Ethics ===
The standards include what real estate agents and brokers must adhere to, such as ethics, conduct, and disclosures, as well as the proper application of techniques. The guidelines are more flexible in order to meet the diversity of requirements that are prevalent throughout the valuation industry and are considerations.

=== Standard version 5 ===
BPOSG has evolved as the industry changes. Version 5.0 was introduced on May 10, 2012 and made available on the nabpop.org website.
