= SPIN (operating system) =

- Developer: University of Washington
- Written in: Modula-3
- OS family: Mach-like
- Working state: Discontinued
- Source model: Open source
- Initial release: 1994; 31 years ago
- Final release: 1.0 / November 1996; 28 years ago
- Repository: www-spin.cs.washington.edu/Distro/docs/downloadInfo.html
- Marketing target: Research
- Available in: English
- Update method: Download, compile
- Platforms: IA-32
- Kernel type: Microkernel
- Official website: www-spin.cs.washington.edu

The SPIN operating system is a research project implemented in the computer programming language Modula-3, and is an open source project. It is designed with three goals: flexibility, safety, and performance. SPIN was developed at the University of Washington.

The kernel can be extended by dynamic loading of modules which implement interfaces that represent domains. These domains are defined by Modula-3 INTERFACE. All kernel extensions are written in Modula-3 safe subset with metalanguage constructs and type safe casting system. The system also issued a special run-time extension compiler.

One set of kernel extensions provides an application programming interface (API) that emulates the Digital UNIX system call interface. This allows Unix applications to run on SPIN.
