= PHP accelerator =

A PHP accelerator is a PHP extension designed to improve the performance of software applications written in the PHP programming language.

== Operation ==
Most PHP accelerators work by caching the compiled opcode/bytecode of PHP representation of php files to avoid the overhead of parsing and compiling source code on each request (some or even most of which may never be executed). To further improve performance, the cached code is stored in shared memory and directly executed from there, minimizing the amount of slow disk reads and memory copying at runtime.

== Practical benefits ==
PHP accelerators substantially increase the speed of PHP applications. Improvements of web page generation throughput by factors of two to seven have been observed.

The effect on application performance of opcode caching varies widely, depending on factors such as the inherent execution time of the PHP application and the percentage of source code actually executed on a given request, and whether additional optimization steps are performed. While a code optimizer may even slow down overall performance when used in isolation, it can provide an additional performance boost when coupled with a bytecode cache, as the optimization effort is performed just once.

== Zend OPcache ==
Zend OPcache is the PHP extension to store precompiled PHP script bytecode in shared memory to improve PHP application performance by minimizing load and parsing PHP scripts on each request. It was introduced under the name Zend Optimizer+ and bundled with PHP since 2013 (PHP 5.5.0). OPcache is included in the PHP distribution but may not be available and/or enabled by default based on PHP's installation and configuration.

== See also ==
- List of PHP accelerators
