= Embedded HTTP server =

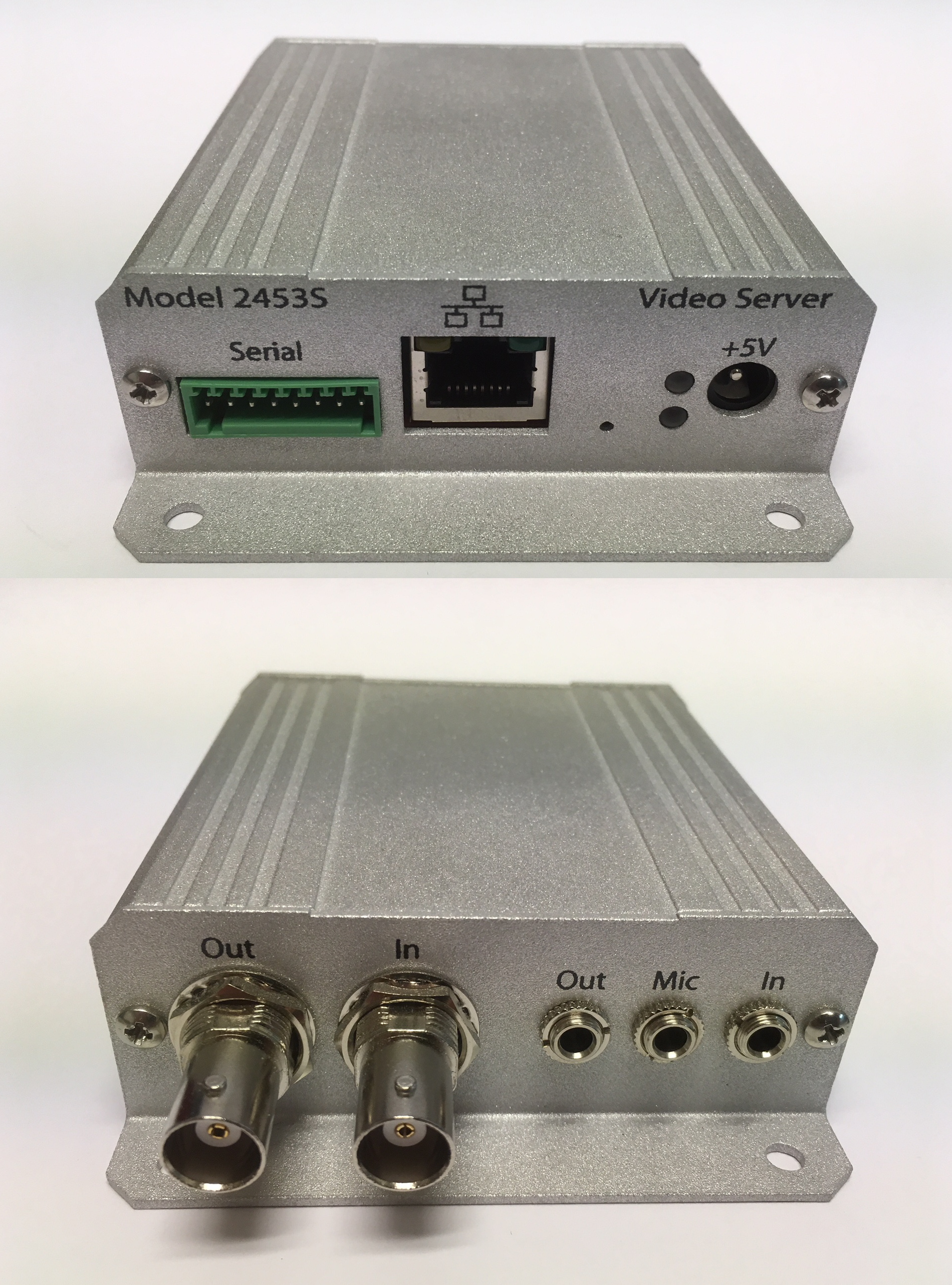
Front and back views of a small IP video server (Sensoray 2453S) with audio and composite video inputs served via HTTP server and other protocols.

An embedded HTTP server is an HTTP server used in an embedded system.

The HTTP server is usually implemented as a software component of an application (embedded) system that controls and/or monitors a machine with mechanical and/or electrical parts.

The HTTP server implements the HTTP protocol in order to allow communications with one or more local or remote users using a browser. The aim is to let users to interact with information provided by the embedded system (user interface, data monitoring, data logging, data configuration, etc.) via network, without using traditional peripherals required for local user interfaces (display, keyboard, etc.).

In some cases the functionalities provided via HTTP server allow also program-to-program communications, e.g. to retrieve data logged about the monitored machine, etc.

== Usages ==
Examples of usage within an embedded application might be (e.g.):

- to provide a thin client interface for a traditional application;
- to provide indexing, reporting, and debugging tools during the development stage;
- to implement a protocol for the distribution and acquisition of information to be displayed in the regular interface — possibly a web service, and possibly using XML as the data format;
- to develop a web application.

== Advantages ==
There are a few advantages to using HTTP to perform the above:

- HTTP is a well studied cross-platform protocol and there are mature implementations freely available;
- HTTP is seldom blocked by firewalls and intranet routers;
- HTTP clients (e.g. web browsers) are readily available with all modern computers;
- there is a growing tendency of using embedded HTTP servers in applications that parallels the rising trends of home-networking and ubiquitous computing.

== Typical requirements ==
Natural limitations of the platforms where an embedded HTTP server runs contribute to the list of the non-functional requirements of the embedded, or more precise, embeddable HTTP server. Some of these requirements are the following ones.

- "Small" RAM and ROM footprint. The exact size depends on the system, but in many cases anything over several megabytes is not embeddable.
- Minimal CPU utilization.
- Cross compilation support for multiple CPU and operating system combinations.
- Easy integration with an existing application, including static linking with the operating system and application.
- Serving pages from application memory if there is no file system.
- Modularity.
- Single thread and multi-thread support.

For every specific project, requirements can vary significantly. For example, ROM and RAM footprints can be a very serious constraint and limit the choices of the system designer. C++ or JVM availability for the system can be another constraint. Frequently performance is an issue, because typical embedded systems run multiple simultaneous tasks and an HTTP server is only one of them and may be configured as a low priority task.

== See also ==
- Comparison of web server software
- Comparison of application servers
- Server (computing)
- HTTP server
- Web server
