= Online credentials for learning =

Online credentials for learning are digital credentials that are offered in place of traditional paper credentials for a skill or educational achievement. They are directly linked to the accelerated development of internet communication technologies, the development of digital badges, electronic passports and massive open online courses (MOOCs).

== History ==
Online credentials have their origin in the concept of open educational resources (OER), which was invented during the Forum on Open Courseware for Higher Education in Developing Countries held in 2002 at UNESCO. Over the next decade the OER concept gained significant traction, and this was confirmed by the World Open Educational Resources (OER) Congress organized by UNESCO in 2012. One of the outcomes of the congress was to encourage the open licensing of educational materials produced with public funds. Creative Commons licensing provides the necessary standardization for copyright permissions, with a strong emphasis on the shift towards sharing and open licensing.

=== Digital credentials ecosystem ===
The digital credentials ecosystem

The digital credentials ecosystem is made up of a combination of traditional (better established) systems and flexible and dynamic (less regulated and new) systems. The challenge for the recognition of learning is that the pace of development, and also the point of departure, of these two aspects is different. The system is made up of seven interrelated sectors and groups of stakeholders, anchored to specific functions in the digital credentials environment.

1. Use. These are the users of credentials, notably learners, who are placed at the centre of the system. Providers and employers can also be users.
2. Provide. Referring to education and training institutions and the emerging variety of for-profit and non-profit digital platforms, such as Coursera, FutureLearn, Credley, Verifdiploma and Mozilla.
3. Award. Awarding bodies in the traditional sense are institutions and professional bodies. Employers, MOOCs, and in some instances also the owners/hosts of digital platforms such as IMS Global are also considered.
4. Quality assure. The lack of quality assurance poses a significant threat to the credibility of digital credentials, and sets constraints on the flexibility of traditional degrees.
5. Evaluate. The evaluation of credentials has been owned by credential evaluation agencies, such as the ENIC-NARIC network and some qualifications authorities.
6. Verify. The range of both public and private verification agencies that have emerged in the last five years has increased and can be attributed to the affordances related to the digitization of credentials.
7. Convene. International agencies and open communities and networks have a role to play within the context.

== Test-based credentials ==
Test-based credentials have gained popularity both in the online market, and in programming and highly technical tasks. These credentials are earned by taking multiple-choice or project-based tests in various skill areas.

== Digital badges ==
Digital badges allow individuals to demonstrate job skills, educational accomplishments, online course completion or just about anything else that a badge creator decides. In 2011, the Mozilla Foundation began the development of an open technical standard called Open Badges - a common framework for the issuance, collection, and display of image files with embedded Metadata that can be used to verify the information contained within a badge. The Open Badges standard is currently maintained by IMS Global and over 40 million Open Badges had been issued as of 2020.

In Europe, since 2000, the work of the CEDEFOP and the adoption in 2009 of the European Guidelines for Validating Non-formal and Informal Learning have supported the development of policies and programs periodically monitored through the European inventory on validation of non-formal and informal learning.

Badges support capturing and translating learning across contexts; encouraging and motivating participation and learning outcomes; and formalizing and enhancing existing social aspects of informal and interest-driven learning. Digital badges are not dissimilar to the concept of the Europass CV. Digital badges can be used as portable and independently verifiable expressions of existing accredited credentials, or used to represent new types of recognition unassociated with traditional quality assurance bodies.

== Online certificates ==
Among alternative credentials, online certificates currently command the highest value, and are nearly comparable to a traditional degree. Earning an online certificate from an online college, a company or an industry-specific organization is typically much more involved than for the other credentials. The certificates are often connected to specific job functions. Many of these certificates have been created by companies such as Cisco, IBM or Microsoft to meet their own needs or the needs of their customers.

Online certificates are also used by many higher education institutions to dematerialize official diplomas or acquired skills, using blockchain technologies.

== See also ==
- Distance education
- Educational research
- Educational technology
- Open educational resources

== Sources ==
This article incorporates text from a free content work. Licensed under CC-BY-SA IGO 3.0 (license statement/permission). Text taken from Level-setting and recognition of learning outcomes: The use of level descriptors in the twenty-first century, 129-131, Keevey, James, UNESCO. UNESCO.
