= Liqun Chen =

Chinese computer scientist

Liqun Chen is a Chinese computer scientist known for her work on trusted systems including Direct Anonymous Attestation, the Trusted Platform Module, and the incorporation of post-quantum cryptography into trusted systems. She works in the UK as Professor in Secure Systems in the University of Surrey School of Computer Science and Electronic Engineering.

== Education and career ==
Chen has a 1988 doctorate from Southeast University in China, with the dissertation Study of an asynchronous speech scrambling system.

After working in the UK at the University of Oxford and Royal Holloway, University of London, she joined HP Labs in Bristol in 1997. It was at HP Labs that she became one of the developers of the Trusted Platform Module in the late 1990s, and a co-designer of Direct Anonymous Attestation in the early 2000s. She moved from HP Labs to the University of Surrey in 2016.

== Recognition ==
Chen was named to the 2026 class of IEEE Fellows, "for contributions to applied cryptography, trusted computing and their standardization".
