= Next Generation Science Standards =

US effort to update education standards

The Next Generation Science Standards is a multi-state effort in the United States to create new education standards that are "rich in content and practice, arranged in a coherent manner across disciplines and grades to provide all students an internationally benchmarked science education." The standards were developed by a consortium of 26 states and by the National Science Teachers Association, the American Association for the Advancement of Science, the National Research Council, and Achieve, a nonprofit organization that was also involved in developing math and English standards. The public was also invited to review the standards, and organizations such as the California Science Teachers Association encouraged this feedback. The final draft of the standards was released in April 2013.

== Goal ==
The purposes of the standards include;

1. Improve the level of scientific literacy among citizens
2. Creating common standards for teaching in the U.S.
3. Making science and engineering relevant for and accessible to all students
4. Developing greater interest in science among students so that more of them choose to major in science and technology in college.

Overall, the guidelines are intended to;

1. Help students deeply understand core scientific concepts,
2. Develop proficiency in the scientific process of developing and testing ideas,
3. Have a greater ability to evaluate scientific evidence.

Curricula based on the standards may cover fewer topics, but will go more deeply into specific topics, possibly using a case-study method and emphasizing critical thinking and primary investigation. Possible approaches to implementing the standards may even include replacing traditionally isolated high school courses such as biology and chemistry with a case-study approach that uses a more holistic method of teaching science to consider both (or more) topics within a single classroom structure. Many education supply companies have already started offering NGSS-aligned products and resources to help teachers implement these new principles.

== Standards ==
The Next Generation Science Standards (NGSS) are based on the "Framework K–12 Science Education" that was created by the National Research Council. They have three dimensions that are integrated in instruction at all levels. The first dimension is the Disciplinary Core Ideas (the DCIs), which consists of content and concepts specific to four disciplines: Life Science, Earth and Space Science, Physical Science, and Engineering, Technology, and Applications of Science. The second dimension is the Science and Engineering Practices (the SEPs), which describe how scientists, engineers, and science students engage in their work of making sense of real-world phenomena and designing solutions to real-world problems. The specific elements of the science and engineering practices from the Framework are identified and described in Appendix F of the Next Generation Science Standards. These practices are asking questions and defining problems; developing and using models; planning and carrying out investigations; analyzing and interpreting data; using mathematics and computational thinking; constructing explanations and designing solutions; engaging in argument from evidence; and obtaining, evaluating, and communicating information. The third dimension is the Crosscutting Concepts, which are thinking tools and ideas that span disciplines and are used to bring disciplinary ideas together to explain a phenomenon or to design a solution to a problem. The NGSS give equal emphasis to engineering design and to scientific inquiry. In addition, they are aligned with the Common Core State Standards by grade and level of difficulty. The standards describe "performance expectations" for students in the areas of science and engineering. They define what students must be able to do in order to show competency.

An important facet of the standards is that learning of content is integrated with doing the practices of scientists and engineers. This is a change from traditional teaching, which typically either dealt with these topics separately or did not attempt to teach practices. According to the NGSS, it is through the integration of content and practice "that science begins to make sense and allows students to apply the material."

== Adoption ==
Over 40 states have shown interest in the standards, and as of March 2023, 20 states, along with the District of Columbia (D.C.), have adopted the standards: Arkansas, California, Connecticut, Delaware, Hawaii, Illinois, Iowa, Kansas, Kentucky, Maine, Maryland, Michigan, Nevada, New Hampshire, New Jersey, New Mexico, Oregon, Rhode Island, Vermont, and Washington. These represent over 36% of the students in U.S.

Unlike the earlier roll-out of the Common Core (CC) mathematics and English language arts standards, states have no financial incentives from federal grants to adopt the Next Generation Science Standards. Previously, adoption of the CC standards was incentivized through states accepting federal grants during the 2009 TARP bailouts. Once states accepted the grant, they accepted the responsibility to adopt "college and career readiness" standards, which didn't have to be CC, but most states chose CC anyway.

The 26 states involved in developing the NGSS, called Lead State Partners, were Arizona, Arkansas, California, Delaware, Georgia, Illinois, Iowa, Kansas, Kentucky, Maine, Maryland, Massachusetts, Michigan, Minnesota, Montana, New Jersey, New York, North Carolina, Ohio, Oregon, Rhode Island, South Dakota, Tennessee, Vermont, Washington, and West Virginia.

When the standards were released in April 2013, many states were expected to adopt them within 1–2 years. However, according to the New York Times, it will take several more years to actually develop curricula based on the new guidelines, to train teachers in implementing them, and to revise standardized tests. In addition, the pace of adoption is expected to be slower than was seen with the Common Core State Standards because, unlike Common Core, in which the states had financial incentives to adopt, there are no similar incentives for the NGSS. Many education supply companies have started offering NGSS-aligned products and resources to help teachers adopt NGSS.

In 2018, Achieve partnered with Concentric Sky to offer digital badges for high-quality learning resources aligned to the NGSS.

== Reception ==
News reports have suggested there will likely be resistance towards the Next Generations Science Standards from conservatives due to the inclusion of anthropogenic climate change and evolution. For example, the New Mexico Public Education Department initially attempted to make changes and deletions in the standards prior to adopting them. According to Skeptical Inquirer, the "proposed changes would have deleted key terms and concepts such as evolution and the 4.6-billion-year age of the Earth. Specifically, 'evolution' would be called 'biological diversity,' the specific age of the Earth would be changed to 'geologic history,' and a 'rise in global temperatures' would be changed to 'temperature fluctuations.'" Following significant protests by the New Mexico Academy of Science, New Mexicans for Science and Reason, the Coalition for Excellence in Science and Engineering as well as scientists, educators, and faith leaders, the department announced in October 2017 that it would adopt the standards in their entirety.

== See also ==
- Common Core State Standards Initiative
