= EPID =

EPID may refer to:

- Electronic Portal Imaging Device used for image-guided radiation therapy
- Enhanced privacy ID, a computer security and identity technology
