= Concentric Sky =

US software development company

- Type: Privately held company
- Founded: 2005; 21 years ago
- Founder: Wayne Skipper
- Headquarters: Eugene, Oregon
- Services: Software Design & Development
- Number of employees: (90 employees (2022))
- Parent: Instructure
- Website: concentricsky.com

Concentric Sky is a software development company located in Eugene, Oregon. The company was founded in 2005 by Wayne Skipper, and grew to nearly 90 employees prior to its sale to Instructure in April 2022. In 2015, Cale Bruckner was promoted to President of the company. Skipper continued to serve as CEO until the company's sale. Concentric Sky is the maker of Badgr and is a contributor to the development of open technology standards focused on improving outcomes for learners and workers.

== History ==
Concentric Sky grew steadily from its founding in 2005. In 2008, the company announced a partnership with GoldMoney to create an iPhone app to allow the transfer of digital units of gold.

In 2009, the company formed a partnership with Encyclopædia Britannica to launch a series of iOS apps for the K-12 education market. That same year, the company released the official iOS app for NASA's Astronomy Picture of the Day and also developed the website for film maker Michael Moore's Capitalism: A Love Story.

In 2010, Concentric Sky Founder Wayne Skipper was asked by Google to submit expert testimony to the Federal Trade Commission regarding Google's acquisition of Admob. That same year, the company partnered with the World Bank to develop a series of data visualization apps and partnered with National Geographic to design and build a series of official study apps for the National Geographic Bee. In 2010, the Internet Engineering Task Force voted to make the company a development partner.

In 2011, the company partnered with the United Nations to develop a data visualization app to support the UN's annual reports. That same year, the company was named "the only App Developer officially endorsed by Mashable."

In 2012, the company designed and built an iPad version of the Encyclopædia Britannica. The app received widespread recognition, including an Appy Award.

In 2013, products featuring Concentric Sky's work for partner Cengage Learning won 2 Codie awards. That same year, the company's work resulted in a US patent for usability improvements to electronic medical records.

In 2014, the company joined the Open Badges movement and launched the Oregon Badge Alliance with partners including Oregon State University. Later that year, the company released an open source Android viewer app for Khan Academy content.

In 2015, the company led the development of Open Badges 2.0 in partnership with MacArthur Foundation spin off, Collective Shift. That same year, the company launched the Badgr project with partner edX. The use of Badgr grew rapidly, and by early 2018 the product had grown to serve nearly 10,000 organizations around the world.

In 2016, the company announced a broad partnership with Collective Shift focused on advancements in education technology and workforce readiness. Under this partnership, the company developed LRNG and took over development of GlassLab Games, which included the educational variants of several popular video games including Civilization and SimCity. GlassLab Games was shut down at the end of 2018, and Concentric Sky worked to release many of the games open source.

In 2017, the company became a founding member of the IEEE Industry Consortium for Learning Engineering, and announced partnerships with the California Community Colleges System, Georgia Department of Education, and SURFnet. The success of the company's Badgr product led to Founder Wayne Skipper being interviewed broadly in the education community, as well as Badgr's inclusion in the European Commission Joint Research Centre's 2017 "Blockchain in Education" report. That same year, the company offered digital badges to commemorate The Great American Eclipse, and another product featuring the company's work for partner Cengage Learning won a Codie award.

In 2018, the company expanded the digital badges ecosystem by releasing an open technology standard called Open Pathways, and by creating a program to award digital badges to learning content aligned to the Next Generation Science Standards. That same year, Mozilla announced the retirement of the Mozilla Backpack and the migration of its users to Badgr, the company announced a new suite of open source tools for edX, Badgr was selected as the native badging solution for the Canvas Learning Management System, the company announced a 4-year partnership with the community college system of Washington state, and products featuring the company's work for partner Cengage Learning won another 2 Codie awards. Later that year, the company's EdRec initiative was named a winner of the US Dept of Education Reimagining Higher Education Ecosystem Challenge for its blockchain-based approach to digital transcripts, and the company's work was featured in the book "The Interconnected Individual.”

In 2019, SURFnet announced a plan for The Netherlands to adopt a national digital credential strategy based on the company's Badgr platform, the company launched a series of tools in partnership with the California Community Colleges System designed to help prospective community college students and their families identify regional educational programs and employment opportunities, and company founder Wayne Skipper was invited to speak at SXSW EDU on the topic of “Open Standards & the Quantification of Learning." During 2019, the company's work was featured by Digital Promise, EdSurge, Educause, IBM, The Inter-American Development Bank, and the Technology Association of Oregon.

In 2020, Microsoft announced the integration of the company's Badgr product into Microsoft Teams, the company co-founded the Open Skills Network with partners including Western Governors University and Walmart, the company's Badgr product was demonstrated by Salesforce and Walmart to the United States Department of Commerce as part of a program serving over 2 million US workers, the company launched a first-of-its-kind comprehensive learner record with the University of North Texas, and the company announced partnerships with The International Association for Continuing Education and Training (IACET), Credential Engine, and Emsi. In December 2020, Concentric Sky and partners including Instructure and Zoom wrote a public letter to the incoming US presidential administration urging an immediate focus on improving student learning outcomes in order to address ongoing issues impacting the US education system.

In 2021, the company announced a proposal for version 3.0 of Open Badges, bringing together the company's work across the World Wide Web Consortium and Decentralized Identity communities, the company released the Open Skills Management Toolkit in partnership with Western Governors University, and the company announced several new partnerships including Blackboard, Postman, and Open eLMS. During 2021, the company's work was featured by the American Institutes for Research, Futuro Health, and numerous other organizations around the world.

In early 2022, the company announced partnerships with the National Student Clearinghouse, and the International Society for Technology in Education (ISTE). In April 2022, the company was acquired by Instructure.

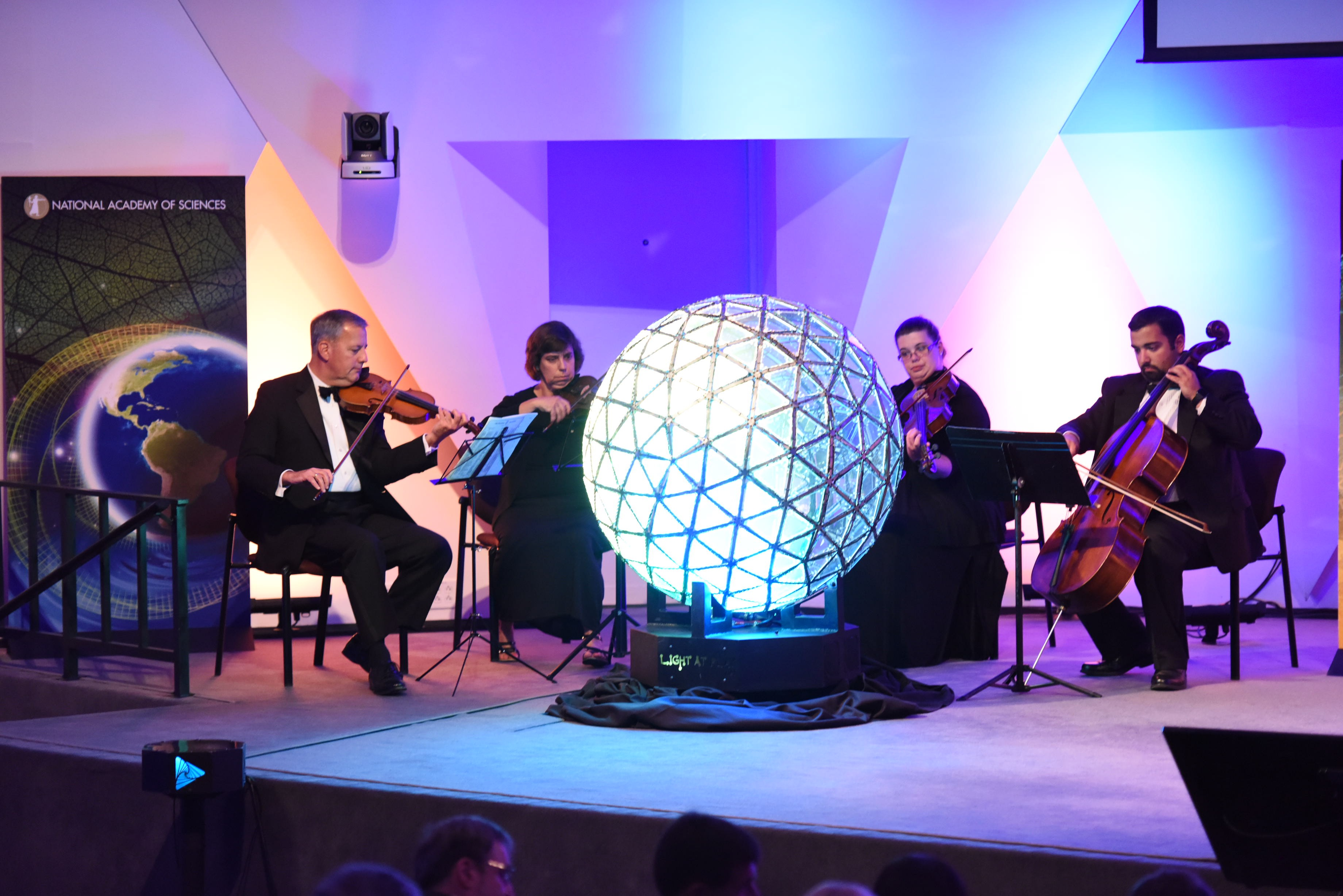
The Radiance Orb at the National Academy of Sciences.

== Culture ==
Named as one of Oregon's Top Workplaces of 2021 by The Oregonian, Concentric Sky is known for its creative company culture. In 2012, the company dubbed its local metro region the Silicon Shire, and began hosting Shire-themed events to promote the region including the annual Shire for the River fundraiser in partnership with the McKenzie River Trust. In 2013, members of Concentric Sky launched an award-winning technology design team known as Light At Play. In 2015, this team developed a series of LED-powered art installations that were showcased in several events around the world as part of the International Year of Light, including displays at the Smithsonian and the National Academy of Sciences.
