= Web Environment Integrity =

Abandoned API proposal by Google

Web Environment Integrity (WEI) is an abandoned API proposal previously under development for Google Chrome. A Web Environment Integrity prototype existed in Chromium from May to November 2023; it was removed after extensive criticism by many tech groups. Its purpose was to verify that interactions with websites were human and authentic as defined by third-party attesters.

== Proposal ==
Sequence diagram showing WEI attestation

The draft proposed an API for websites to get a digitally signed token that contains the certifier's name and whether or not they deem the web client to be authentic. The stated goal was for sites to be able to restrict access to human users instead of automated programs and "allow web servers to evaluate the authenticity of the device and honest representation of the software stack and the traffic from the device". Access to this API would not be allowed in non-secure (HTTP) contexts.

== History ==
The proposal first showed up as a commit to Chromium in April before being announced by its developers, Google engineers, in May. It received a few concerned comments from those who followed the browser's rendering engine's development. After discussion at W3C in late April, its working draft specification was published as part of the process to develop standards for the web on July 21, 2023. As a result, users flooded the proposal's GitHub repository with critical comments and flaming of the proposal's authors. As a result, the Google engineers limited comment to those who have contributed to the repository and added a code of conduct. On the same day, Chromium's preliminary code to implement the standard was enabled.

On November 2, 2023, Google abandoned the proposal, removed the prototype implementation from Chromium, and proposed a replacement API named "Android WebView Media Integrity API" limited to WebViews on Android. Google tested the new API with partners in early 2024. As of late 2024, WebView Media Integrity API is available to all developers.

== Reception ==
The proposal received widespread criticism for limiting general purpose computing, with some comparing WEI to digital rights management (DRM). Others have accused the standard of being evidence of Google abusing Chrome's near-monopoly of browser share. Some have issued official statements on the matter in 2023:

- On July 25, Mozilla opposed it, stating "Any browser, server, or publisher that implements common standards is automatically part of the Web ... Mechanisms that attempt to restrict these choices are harmful to the openness of the Web ecosystem and are not good for users."
- On July 27, Vivaldi opposed it as "simply dangerous" and feared that attestation providers would not be trustworthy.
- On July 29, the Free Software Foundation opposed it as "an all-out attack on the free Internet" and claimed it would significantly limit the browsers that could be used.
- On August 1, Brave Software announced they will not include WEI in their web browser.
- On August 7, the Electronic Frontier Foundation opposed it as "a bad idea that Google should not pursue" and opposed its proposal of selecting a "small percentage" of random users to simulate behavior without WEI in order to prevent websites from blocking unattested users. The EFF claimed that "[m]any websites will consider that 'small percentage' of users an acceptable price to pay" and feared Google would set the percentage extremely low to combat ad fraud.
- On August 11, the World Wide Web Consortium refrained from taking a stance as it was "not being worked on in W3C, nor has there been any submission [for W3C] review".

== See also ==
- Private Access Tokens
- Remote attestation
