= P2PU =

Nonprofit online open learning community

Peer 2 Peer University
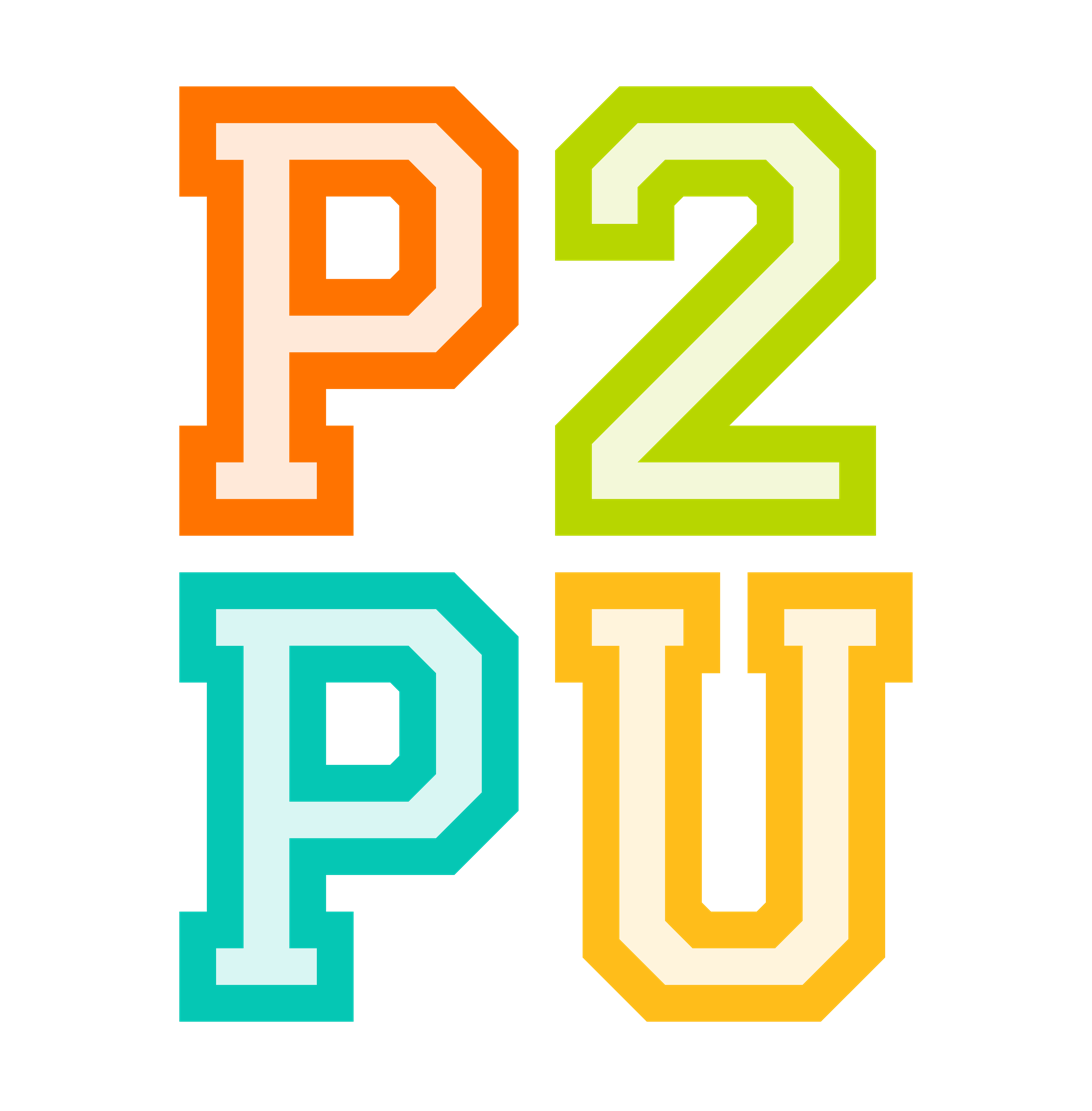
- Formation: 2007; 19 years ago
- Founders: Philipp Schmidt, Delia Browne, Neeru Paharia, Stian Haklev, and Joel Thierstein
- Website: p2pu.org

Peer 2 Peer University (P2PU) is a nonprofit online open learning community which allows users to organize and participate in courses and study groups to learn about specific topics. Peer 2 Peer University was started in 2009 with funding from the Hewlett Foundation and the Shuttleworth Foundation, with its first of courses in September of that year. An example of the "edupunk" approach to education, P2PU charges no tuition and courses are not accredited. However, some courses in "The School of Webcraft" provide the opportunity for recognition of achievements through the Open Badges project.

P2PU offers some of the features of massive open online courses (MOOCs), but is focused on people sharing their knowledge on a topic or learning about a topic offered by another user with a DIY wiki-type mentality. Unlike typical massive open online courses, anyone can create a course as well as take one. Additionally, because of its less hierarchical nature, P2PU activities need not necessarily be Courses; the admin of the learning environment can select from Study Group and Challenge as well as creating their own term.

== Academic profile ==
P2PU's peer-to-peer philosophy is meant to put a "social and pedagogical wrapper" around open access and educational materials. There is some evidence to suggest that greater social participation in P2PU may lead to more invested learning than other online education. For instance, in an early P2PU course on cyberpunk literature, research noted "a shift from the subject-authority pattern of relations generally associated with teacher-led education to the agential pattern of relations associated with peer-led education." Class participants communicate live through technologies such as Skype and IRC as well as asynchronously through the P2PU website, allowing geographically dispersed classmates to have discussions. P2PU is organized into Schools which include:

- Social Innovation – Focused on social innovation.
- School of Webcraft – Backed by Mozilla
- School of Open – Coordinated with Creative Commons
- School of Education – Focused on pedagogy
- Mathematical Future – coordinated with Natural Math family learning network and Math 2.0 interest group.

P2PU's school of Webcraft courses were early adopters of a badge reward system, and with their task completion system there are elements of gamification and gamification of learning.

== Infrastructure ==
The main learning management system for P2PU courses is called Lernanta (the Esperanto word for "learning"). It is written in Python using the Django web framework, and is developed and maintained by P2PU's community and staff. One P2PU study group, "Introduction to Contributing to Lernanta", is designed to help people become Lernanta contributors. A fork of the Mozilla Foundation's Batacuda software that powers drumbeat.org, Lernanta is available under the Mozilla Public License, the GNU GPL, and the LGPL. P2PU also hosts a wiki and an OSQA server for questions and answers.

== Projects ==
P2PU is hosting and coordinating the MOOC joint-venture Mechanical MOOC which is a blend of open online resources. The first Mechanical MOOC class will be “A Gentle Introduction to Python,” which is part M.I.T. OpenCourseWare, instant-feedback exercises and quizzes from Codecademy, and study groups organized by OpenStudy, while P2PU handles central communication such as email and discussion. Mechanical MOOC is less tightly structured than traditional MOOC offerings that are backed by universities, and offers no accreditation. Yet the initiators claim that this comes with an advantage they will capitalize on: if a student falls behind, they may repeat units at their own pace to catch up.

== History ==
The founding members of P2PU are Delia Browne, Neeru Paharia, Stian Haklev, Joel Thierstein and Philipp Schmidt. The organization is a 501(c)(3) nonprofit with funding from The Hewlett Foundation, The Shuttleworth Foundation, and University of California Irvine.

Schmidt explained in a video interview that P2PU came to be when he and his friends, later to become his co-founders, attempted to put the championed open educational resources to the test, and try to learn from them. They selected a topic they were unfamiliar with, Psychology, and set up weekly calls, to try to learn as a group with the materials. Schmidt says it was "incredibly hard," and "what's more important is the social aspect, that bond that forms between people, and the content is really just the beginning of the learning experience."

Plans for P2PU were announced in October 2008. The first set of courses was originally planned to begin in January 2009, but the official launch was delayed until September 2009. The project was initially supported by a $70,000 grant from the William and Flora Hewlett Foundation.

In September 2009, P2PU ran seven pilot courses with a total of 227 participants. As of September 2011, P2PU claims "a community of about 1,000" and has over 50 courses open for sign-up.
