= Microdegree =

Certification of a component part of a formal qualification

In higher education a microdegree, microcredential or microcourse is a qualification focused upon a specified professional or career discipline and typically comprises one or more sources of accelerated educational experiences. Microdegrees are a single manifestation of Competency Based Education (CBE) which seeks to tie credentialing to specific skill sets. Micro-credentials may be completed on-site, online or in a blended format.

== Overview ==
Microcredentials including microdegrees act as a pointer to the criteria for and demonstration of the skills represented by the microcredential. Because the credentials are presented in a digital format, they can be parsed automatically for verification over the web and allow for a greater level of granularity than a traditional paper transcript. Microdegrees meet the criteria for Open Educational Data defined by the U.S. Department of Education.

Within the hierarchy of educational credentials microdegrees are considered to be "certificates" requiring a lower level of commitment and rigor than a traditional degree program but serving an important role as a vocational credential.

Microcredentials may have a credit value at either undergraduate or postgraduate level, and this may be used towards undergraduate or postgraduate qualifications. or potentially at another university (subject to the agreement of the receiving institution).

In Ireland, the Higher Education Authority has funded learner-fee subsidies for higher education micro-credentials. Under the 2026 scheme, eligible micro-credentials must award between 5 and 20 ECTS credits and be aligned to Levels 6 to 9 of the National Framework of Qualifications.

The advent of the microdegree is presented by its promoters as a challenge to the existing degree model as it permits students to utilize accelerated, free and low cost programs to earn credentials of direct relevance to their interests and career ambitions.

Microdegrees and other microcredentials are also seen as a system to facilitate and record lifelong learning. A significant percentage of microdegree students are working adults seeking career change or advancement.

Some institutions that offer microdegree programs describe themselves as a "Micro College".

In recent years, MOOC platforms have started expanding their offerings of microcredentials as viable substitutes, going as far as offering a blended education model. Such programs allow graduates of the respective microcredential programs to have a reduced residency period at traditional universities. For example, the MIT admitted in 2018 its first cohort of students in supply chain management at a reduced five-month residency period through their blended learning initiatives on the edX platform with the launch of its MicroMasters program.

== See also ==
- Digital badge
