= CYSEC =

European space cybersecurity company

- Formerly: ARCATrust SA
- Type: Private
- Industry: Cybersecurity
- Founded: 2018; 8 years ago in Lausanne, Switzerland
- Founders: Patrick Trinkler; Yacine Felk
- Headquarters: Esch-sur-Alzette, Luxembourg
- Number of locations: 3 offices (Esch-sur-Alzette, Toulouse, Lausanne)
- Key people: Patrick Trinkler (CEO)
- Products: ARCA Trusted OS; ARCA SATLINK; ARCA SATCOM
- Number of employees: 57 (2026)
- Website: www.cysec.com

CYSEC is a European cybersecurity company headquartered in Esch-sur-Alzette, Luxembourg. Founded in 2018 in Lausanne, Switzerland, the company develops confidential computing and satellite communications security software. It has carried out contracts for the European Space Agency (ESA) and the French space agency CNES.

CYSEC is also the creator and organizer of CYSAT, a conference series on cybersecurity for the space industry, held annually in Paris with additional editions in the United States and Singapore.

== History ==
CYSEC was founded in 2018 at the Innovation Park of EPFL in Lausanne, initially under the name ARCATrust SA. Two of the founders, Patrick Trinkler and Yacine Felk, previously worked for the quantum cryptography company ID Quantique. The company received a Tech Seed loan from FIT in 2018 and joined the European Space Agency's business incubation programme in 2019. According to Tribune de Genève, the company generated CHF 1 million in revenue in its first year, initially serving Geneva banks seeking secure custody channels for digital assets, before shifting to the space sector around 2020.

In 2020, it received a CHF 500,000 Tech Growth loan from the Swiss Foundation for Technological Innovation (FIT).

In January 2022, CYSEC closed a CHF 4 million seed extension round led by Line Break Capital with participation from Indaco Venture Partners, bringing its total funding to CHF 7 million, and opened an office in Toulouse. A first test in space followed in the same month, when an early version of the company's software flew on a SpaceX launch. In October 2022, the French venture capital firm Karista invested €2 million to fund the company's expansion in the space sector. The company was listed among the Top 100 Swiss Startups from 2020 to 2023. A directory of the French space industry published by CNES in September 2023 listed the company with 32 employees, 20 of them in space activities, and space-related turnover of about €1 million.

The company subsequently relocated its headquarters to Esch-sur-Alzette, Luxembourg. In 2026, CYSEC was one of twelve European start-ups awarded a €100,000 prize by the European Union Agency for the Space Programme (EUSPA), in the CASSINI Challenges competition, for its ARCA SATCOM product.

== Products ==
CYSEC markets its products under its ARCA brand.

=== ARCA Trusted OS ===
ARCA Trusted OS is a hardened, Linux-based operating system for running containerized workloads and virtual machines inside trusted execution environments. It is designed to protect data at rest, in transit and in use, and supports confidential virtual machines based on AMD SEV-SNP technology.

=== ARCA SATLINK ===
ARCA SATLINK is a software implementation of the Space Data Link Security (SDLS) protocol defined by the Consultative Committee for Space Data Systems (CCSDS). It provides encryption, authentication and key management for satellite telemetry and telecommand (TMTC) links, targeting satellite constellation operators. The product was tested in orbit as part of an ESA in-orbit demonstration project. The demonstration ran on ESA's OPS-SAT satellite in late 2023.

=== ARCA SATCOM ===
ARCA SATCOM is a VPN and encrypted performance-enhancing proxy (PEP) for securing data transmitted over commercial satellite internet links while limiting the latency impact of encryption. According to EUSPA, it is the first European performance-enhancing proxy with built-in encryption, intended to let governmental users adopt commercial satellite communication services with GOVSATCOM-grade security. In 2024, the satellite operator Thuraya announced a partnership with CYSEC around satellite cybersecurity.

== Space agency contracts ==
In April 2020, ESA awarded CYSEC a contract to develop measures against cyber risks in ship tracking systems that rely on satellite communications, following spoofing and jamming attacks against GNSS-based vessel positioning.

In November 2021, the company was contracted under ESA's ARTES Space Systems for Safety and Security (4S) programme to develop end-to-end protection of governmental data exchanged over commercial satellite links, with technical support from the Cyber-Defence Campus of Armasuisse.

In December 2025, CYSEC won a contract with CNES under the France 2030 programme to develop and test in orbit a hardware-accelerated version of its Space Data Link Security implementation, using FPGA-based cryptographic acceleration for high-speed Earth observation data downlink.

== CYSAT conference ==
CYSAT is a conference series on cybersecurity for the space industry, created by CYSEC in 2021. It brings together space agencies, satellite manufacturers and operators, security researchers and ethical hackers. Its main edition is held annually in Paris, and the series has expanded with editions in the United States and Asia; according to the company, the events gather more than 1,000 participants each year.

=== Editions ===
The first edition of CYSAT was held in March 2021, with around 200 participants; Tribune de Genève reported that Swiss federal councillor and defence minister Viola Amherd attended the conference, reflecting official attention to cyber threats against the space industry.

Since 2022, the main edition has been held annually at Station F in Paris. The 2023 event included a presentation by security researchers from Thales on how they had ethically compromised and safely recovered ESA's OPS-SAT satellite. The series has also held editions internationally: a first CYSAT USA at the Embassy of Switzerland in Washington, D.C., followed by a second US edition in April 2025 at the University of Colorado in Colorado Springs, co-organized with the Space Information Sharing and Analysis Center (Space ISAC) alongside the Space Symposium, and a CYSAT track at the Cybersecurity Business Convention in Toulouse in 2025.

The three most recent editions were:

- The first CYSAT Asia edition, on 5 February 2026 at the Sands Expo & Convention Centre at Marina Bay Sands in Singapore, co-organized with the Singapore government-backed investor SGInnovate. The event gathered 400 participants from 25 European and Asian countries, with David Koh, Singapore's Chief Commissioner of Cybersecurity, as guest of honour and speakers from Airbus, the European Commission, Fraunhofer, IonQ and Thales.
- CYSAT 2026, the sixth Paris edition, held on 20–21 May 2026 at Station F with a programme of more than 75 speakers covering 5G/6G non-terrestrial network security, artificial intelligence, quantum resilience and emerging EU regulatory frameworks for space systems.
- The series added a Spanish edition, CYSAT Madrid, on 28 October 2026 at the Digitaliza Madrid innovation centre, during Madrid Tech Week.
