= Credential =

Document proving authority or qualification

A credential is a piece of any document that details a qualification, competence, or authority issued to an individual by a third party with a relevant or de facto authority or assumed competence to do so.

Examples of credentials include academic diplomas, academic degrees, certifications, security clearances, identification documents, badges, passwords, user names, keys, powers of attorney, and so on. Sometimes publications, such as scientific papers or books, may be viewed as similar to credentials by some people, especially if the publication was peer reviewed or made in a well-known journal or reputable publisher.

== Types and documentation of credentials ==
A person holding a credential is usually given documentation or secret knowledge (e.g., a password or key) as proof of the credential. Sometimes this proof (or a copy of it) is held by a third, trusted party. While in some cases a credential may be as simple as a paper membership card, in other cases, such as diplomas, it involves the presentation of letters directly from the issuer of the credential its faith in the person representing them in a negotiation or meeting.

Counterfeiting of credentials is a constant and serious problem, irrespective of the type of credential. A great deal of effort goes into finding methods to reduce or prevent counterfeiting.In general, the greater the perceived value of a credential, the more significant the problem of counterfeiting, and the greater the lengths to which the issuer must go to prevent fraud.

=== Diplomacy ===
In diplomacy, credentials, also known as a letter of credence, are documents that ambassadors, diplomatic ministers, plenipotentiaries, and chargés d'affaires provide to the government to which they are accredited, for the purpose, chiefly, of communicating to the latter the envoy's diplomatic rank. It also contains a request that full credence be accorded to his official statements. Until his credentials have been presented and found in proper order, an envoy receives no official recognition.

The credentials of an ambassador or minister plenipotentiary are signed by the head of state, those of a chargé d'affaires by the foreign minister. Diplomatic credentials are granted and withdrawn at the pleasure of the issuing authority, based on widely varying criteria. A receiving government may reject a diplomat’s credentials by declining to receive them, but in practice this rarely happens.

=== Medicine ===
In medicine, the process of credentialing is a detailed review of all permissions granted a medical doctor, physician assistant or nurse practitioner at every institution at which he or she has worked in the past, to determine a risk profile for them at a new institution. It vets the practitioner for both receiving practice insurance and the ability to bill to insurance for patient care. As well, it certifies legal and administrative body requirements, such as the Joint Commission.

Medical practitioners must also have credentials in the form of licenses issued by the government of the jurisdictions in which they practice, which they obtain after suitable education, training, and/or practical experience. Most medical credentials are granted for a practice specific group. They may also be withdrawn in the event of fraud or malpractice by their holders. Typically they require continuing education validation and renewal to continue practice.

=== Information technology ===
Information systems commonly use credentials to control access to information or other resources. The classic combination of a user's account number or name and a secret password is a widely used example of IT credentials. An increasing number of information systems use other forms of documentation of credentials, such as biometrics (fingerprints, voice recognition, retinal scans), X.509, public key certificates, and so on.

=== Cryptography ===
Credentials in cryptography establish the identity of a party to communication. Usually they take the form of machine-readable cryptographic keys and/or passwords. Cryptographic credentials may be self-issued, or issued by a trusted third party; in many cases the only criterion for issuance is unambiguous association of the credential with a specific, real individual or other entity. Cryptographic credentials are often designed to expire after a certain period, although this is not mandatory. An X.509 public key certificate is an example of a cryptographic credential.

=== Operator licensing ===
Operators of vehicles such as automobiles, boats, and aircraft must have credentials in the form of government-issued licenses in many jurisdictions. Often the documentation of the license consists of a simple card or certificate that the operator keeps on his person while operating the vehicle, backed up by an archival record of the license at some central location. Licenses are granted to operators after a period of successful training and/or examination.

This type of credential often requires certification of good health and may also require psychological evaluations and screening for substance abuse.

Operator licenses often expire periodically and must be renewed at intervals. Renewal may simply be a formality, or it may require a new round of examinations and training.

=== Security clearances ===
In military and government organizations, and some private organizations, a system of compartmentalizing information exists to prevent the uncontrolled dissemination of information considered to be sensitive or confidential. Persons with a legitimate need to have access to such information are issued security clearances, which can be tracked and verified to ensure that no unauthorized persons gain access to protected information.

Security clearances are among the most carefully guarded credentials. Often they are granted to individuals only after a lengthy investigation and only after their need to have access to protected information has been adequately justified to the issuing authority. The most elaborate security-clearance systems are found in the world's military organizations. Some credentials of this type are considered so sensitive that their holders are not even permitted to acknowledge that they have them (except to authorized parties). Documentation of security clearances usually consists of records kept at a secure facility and verifiable on demand from authorized parties.

Breaches of security involving security clearances are often punished by specific statutory law, particularly if they occur in the context of deliberate espionage, whereas most other counterfeiting and misuse of credentials is punished by law only when used with deliberate intent to defraud in specific contexts. Security clearances are regularly withdrawn when they are no longer justified, or when the person holding them is determined to be too great a security risk.

=== Journalism ===
In many democratic nations, press credentials are not required at the national or federal level for any publication of any kind. However, individual corporations, and certain government or military entities require press credentials, such as a press pass, as a formal invitation to members of the press which grants them rights to photographs or videos, press conferences, or interviews. Press credentials indicate that a person has been verified as working for a known publication, and holding a press pass typically allows that person special treatment or access rights.

Some governments impose restrictions on who may work as a journalist, requiring anyone working for the press to carry government-issued credentials. Restricting press credentials can be problematic because of its limitations on freedom of the press, particularly if government leaders selectively grant, withhold, or withdraw press credentials to disallow critique of government policy. Any press coverage published under governments that restrict journalism in this way is often treated with skepticism by others, and may not be considered any more truthful or informative than propaganda.

=== Trade credentials ===
Some trades and professions in some jurisdictions require special credentials of anyone practicing the trade or profession. These credentials may or may not be associated with specific competencies or skills. In some cases, they exist mainly to control the number of people who are allowed to exercise a trade or profession, in order to control salaries and wages.

Persons acting as merchants, freelancers, etc., may require special credentials in some jurisdictions as well. Here again, the purpose is mainly to control the number of people working in this way, and sometimes also to track them for tax-reporting or other purposes like people evaluation.

=== Academic and professional credentials ===
The academic and professional world makes very extensive use of credentials, such as diplomas, degrees, certificates, and certifications, in order to attest to the completion of specific training or education programs by students, to attest to their successful completion of tests and exams, and to provide independent validation of an individual's possession of the knowledge, skills, and ability necessary to practice a particular occupation competently, (for example: Arun Paul MSW, MPHIL).

Documentation of academic and professional credentials usually consists of a printed, formal document. The issuing institution often maintains a record of the credential as well. Academic credentials are normally valid for the lifetime of the person to whom they are issued. Professional certifications are normally valid for a limited number of years, based on the pace of change in the certified profession, and require periodic re-certification through re-examination (to demonstrate continuing competency as occupational standards of practice evolve) or continuing professional development (to demonstrate continually enhanced competency).

Acquisition of these credentials often leads to increased economic mobility and work opportunity, especially for low-income people. A general term for academic credentials in the form of a resume is Curriculum vitae, often abbreviated as CV.

=== Titles ===
Titles are credentials that identify a person as belonging to a specific group, such as nobility or aristocracy, or a specific command grade in the military, or in other largely symbolic ways. They may or may not be associated with specific authority, and they do not usually attest to any specific competence or skill (although they may be associated with other credentials that do). A partial list of such titles includes.

- personal titles, such as Lord, Knight, Right Honourable, indicating an earned or inherited rank or position within a formal power structure;
- command ranks, such as Captain, Sergeant, etc., indicating likewise a very specific position in a command hierarchy, e.g. police rank or military rank;
- an academic degree or professional designation such as PhD, EurIng, P.Eng or M.D., whether this be purely honorary or symbolic, or associated with credentials attesting to specific competence, learning, or skills;
- labor union and club memberships;
- persons allowed access to specific areas during special events, such as concerts and shows;
- citizenship, as in the case of passports and birth certificates.

== See also ==
- Access badge
- Access control
- Common Access Card
- Credential evaluation
- Credit CARD Act of 2009 card
- Digital credential
- Diploma mill
- Keycard
- Magnetic stripe
- Microdegree
- Online credentials for learning
- Physical security
- Proximity card
- Smart card
- Swipe card
- Tech certificate
- Credentialism and educational inflation
