= Transformative assessment =

Transformative assessment is a form of assessment that uses “institution-wide assessment strategies that are based on institutional goals and implemented in an integrated way for all levels (the course, the program, and the institution) to systematically transform teaching and learning.” Transformative assessment is focused on the quality of the assessment instruments and how well the assessment measures achieving of a goal. "The classic approach is to say, if you want more of something, measure it"

There is a dialectical aspect to transformative assessment with standardized measures that implicitly claim that learning can be decontextualized and that comparisons of scores across contexts hold meaning. Transformative assessment by its title implies that there is no single absolute standard that can be assessed, and that each context requires its own definition of a successful learning performance. Further, the process of assessment will do much to shape the performance that defines the outcome. Central to transformative assessment, therefore, are the stakeholders (faculty AND students) who engage in the assessment process. Because standardized measures rarely involve faculty who teach or the hearts of the students who learn, they are not transformative.

This is unlike Student-centered learning, where the focus is on the needs of the student, and also unlike Standards-based assessment where the focus is on the institution achieving a specific level of learner proficiency. Neither of those strategies help the institution to reform at all levels.

== History ==
The Transformational Assessment Project (TAP) was an activity within the EDUCAUSE National Learning Infrastructure Initiative (since renamed the EDUCAUSE Learning Initiative (ELI)). The project was active from January 2002 to September 2003 and was coordinated by Vicki Suter of EDUCAUSE. Core members were Gary Brown, Darren Cambridge, Steve Ehrmann (The TLT Group), Joan Lippincott (CNI), Patricia McGee, Vicki Suter (NLII) and Robin Zuniga (The TLT Group); Colleen Carmean served as a member during her tenure as NLII 2002 Fellow. Project members made presentations on the work at Educause 2002, NLII 2003 Annual Meeting and the AAHE Assessment conference in 2003. The project produced a rubric for evaluating the transformative potential of an assessment program or plan. While the project produced a tool for assessing the transformative potential of institutional assessment strategies, it did not produce any implementation.

== Rubric Dimensions ==
Assessment Purpose

The assessment plan aligns with other institutional plans and promotes a collaboration of administration, faculty, students, and community.

Data Acquisition & Analysis

Data from multiple and diverse sources illuminate students’ learning, learning processes, and learning purposes, particularly learning as those aspects of learning extend beyond course- specific outcomes.

Application of Findings

The assessment findings are used to systematically inform and reshape teaching and learning practice to improve effectiveness, efficiency, and/or value, and specifically to promote an operational “culture of evidence” (e.g., influence promotion and tenure decisions).

Dissemination

Results are reported internally and externally with plans for expanding the collaboration for transformation.

== Implementations ==
- A series of blog posts in 2008 by Nils Peterson, Theron Desrosier, and Jayme Jacobson are exploring transforming the grade book to closer align with the criteria of the transformative assessment rubric.
- Washington State University is attempting to implement a version of transformative assessment as part of its University re-accreditation process.
