= Digital badge =

Indicator of accomplishment

Digital badges (also known as ebadges, or singularly as ebadge) are a validated indicator of accomplishment, skill, quality or interest that can be earned in various learning environments.

== Origin and development ==
Traditional physical badges have been used for many years by various organizations such as the Russian Army and the Boy Scouts of America to give members a physical emblem to display the accomplishment of various achievements.

While physical badges have been in use for hundreds of years, the idea of digital badges is a relatively recent development drawn from research into gamification. As game elements, badges have been used by organizations such as Foursquare and Huffington Post to reward users for accomplishing certain tasks. In 2005, Microsoft introduced the Xbox 360 Gamerscore system, which is considered to be the original implementation of an achievement system.

According to Shields & Chugh (2017, pg 1817), "digital badges are quickly becoming an appropriate, easy and efficient way for educators, community groups and other professional organisations to exhibit and reward participants for skills obtained in professional development or formal and informal learning".

In 2007, Eva Baker, the President of the American Educational Research Association (AERA), gave the Presidential Address at their annual conference on the need to develop merit-badge-like "Qualifications" that certify accomplishments, not through standardized tests, but as "an integrated experience with performance requirements." Such a system would apply to learning both in and out of school and support youth to develop and pursue passionate interests. Baker envisioned youth assembling "their unique Qualifications to show to their families, to adults in university and workforce, and to themselves." Ultimately, Baker believed "the path of Qualifications shifts attention from schoolwork to usable and compelling skills, from school life to real life."

In early 2010, the digital badge service provider Basno launched a platform that allowed users to create and collect badges that represent real-world accomplishments like running the 2011 ING New York City Marathon. The effort marked a strong shift from viewing badges as game-like elements to creating badges to certify learning. Many instructional sites such as P2PU and Khan Academy make use of a digital badging system.

In September 2011, US Secretary of Education Arne Duncan, announced the launch of the HASTAC/MacArthur Foundation Badges for Lifelong Learning Competition. According to Arne Duncan, badges "can help engage students in learning and broaden the avenues for all learners or all ages, to acquire and to demonstrate as well as document and display their skills. Badges can help speed the shift from credentials that simply measure seat time to ones that more accurately measure competency, and we must do everything we can to accelerate that transition.It can also help to account for both formal and informal learning and in a variety of different settings." Funded by the MacArthur Foundation, with additional support from the Gates Foundation, HASTAC administers the Badges for Lifelong Learning Competition, which awarded funds to thirty organizations in March 2012.

=== Open Badge standard ===
Mozilla's Open Badges Project
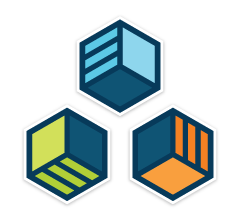
- Website: openbadges.org
- Launched: 15 September 2011; 15 years ago

The use of digital badges as credentials remained largely under the radar until 2011, following the release of "An Open Badge System Framework", a white paper authored by Peer 2 Peer University and the Mozilla Foundation. In the paper, badges are explained as "a symbol or indicator of an accomplishment, skill, quality or interest," with examples of badge systems used by the Boy Scouts and Girl Scouts, PADI diving instruction, and the more recently popular geo-locative games, like Foursquare. The report asserts that badges "have been successfully used to set goals, motivate behaviors, represent achievements and communicate success in many contexts" and proposes that when learning happens across various contexts and experiences, "badges can have a significant impact, and can be used to motivate learning, signify community and signal achievement." The report also makes clear that the value of badges comes less from its visual representation than from the context around how and why it was conferred. The stronger the connection between the two, the more effective the badging system will be. "Badges are conversation starters," the report explains, "and the information linked to or 'behind' each badge serves as justification and even validation of the badge." For example, a badge should include information about how it was earned, who issued it, the date of issue, and, ideally, a link back to some form of artifact relating to the work behind the badge.

Later in 2011, the Mozilla Foundation announced their plan to develop an open technical standard called Open Badges to create and build a common system for the issuance, collection, and display of digital badges on multiple instructional sites.

To launch the Open Badges project, Mozilla and MacArthur engaged with over 300 nonprofit organizations, government agencies and others about informal learning, breaking down education monopolies and fuelling individual motivation. Much of this work was guided by "Open Badges for Lifelong Learning", an early working paper created by Mozilla and the MacArthur Foundation.

In 2012, Mozilla launched Open Badges 1.0 and partnered with the City of Chicago to launch The Chicago Summer of Learning (CSOL), a badges initiative to keep local youth aged four to 24 active and engaged during the summer. Institutions and organizations like Purdue University, MOUSE and the U.K.-based DigitalME adopted badges, and Mozilla saw international interest in badging programs from Australia and Italy to China and Scotland.

By 2013, over 1,450 organizations were issuing Open Badges and Mozilla's partnership with Chicago had grown into the Cities of Learning Initiative, an opportunity to apply CSOL's success across the country.

In 2014, Mozilla launched the Badge Alliance, a network of organizations and individuals committed to building the open badging ecosystem and advancing the Open Badges specification. Founding members include Mozilla, the MacArthur Foundation, DigitalME, Sprout Fund, National Writing Project, Blackboard and others. More than 650 organizations from six continents signed up through the Badge Alliance to contribute to the Open Badges ecosystem.

In 2015, the Badge Alliance spun out of Mozilla and became a part of MacArthur Foundation spin off, Collective Shift - a nonprofit devoted to redesigning social systems for a connected world. Later that year, Collective Shift partnered with Concentric Sky to develop Open Badges 2.0. That same year, Concentric Sky launched the open source project Badgr to serve as a reference implementation for Open Badges.

In early 2016, IMS Global announced their commitment to Open Badges as an inter-operable standard for digital credentials, and in late 2016, Mozilla announced that stewardship of the Open Badges standard would transition officially to IMS Global.

In late 2018, Mozilla announced that it would retire the Mozilla Backpack (see below) and migrate all users to Badgr.

== Functions ==
Just as badges in the physical world serve many functions, digital badges are employed in a variety of ways. Badges can serve different functions depending on the activities with which they are associated. Commonly, badges are thought of as rewards but have been found to be most effective when they also contribute to goal setting, reputation, status affirmation, instruction and group identification. Badges also promote lifelong learning that extends beyond the classroom and brings to light accomplishments that otherwise might have been hidden. Digital badges are associated with the gamification of learning, whereby game design and game mechanics are used in non-game contexts to encourage learning. Gibbons (2020) identified 13 roles for digital open badges in a higher education setting.

Benefits associated with digital badges include the ability to capture the complete learning path, so it "travels" with the user wherever they decide to display the badge. The digital badge carries with it information about assessment, evidence and other metadata required by the badge. Digital badges can signal achievement to potential employers; motivate engagement and collaboration; improve retention and levelling up in learning; support innovation and flexibility in the skills that matter; and build and formalize identity and reputation within learning communities.

Some digital badge platforms allow organizations to create, issue, earn and display digital badges on members' websites, social media pages, and resumes.

=== Motivation to participate ===
One of the ways in which badges are often used is to encourage participation by recognizing the participants. Motivation is often one of the major reasons designers decide to employ badges. Participation is encouraged because badges offer a new pathway of lifelong learning separate from the traditional, formalized academic pathway. Badges highlight and recognize skills and knowledge that come from personal initiative and investigation.

When TripAdvisor started showing badges on user pages, they explicitly indicated that this was to recognize the most frequent contributors. Systems that have been successful at motivating people with badges cite their ability to intrinsically motivate participants by showcasing challenges overcome, displaying pathways for learning, and improving social connections.

In 2016, IBM used Open Badges to launch a world-wide training initiative and saw dramatic increases in employee participation.

=== Motivation to collaborate ===
Unlike most online media, open badge programs are collaborative ones that promote active, engaged involvement. While there are several modes of online collective action, all of the systems are largely run by a very small number of people; "for example, just two percent of Wikipedia users account for 75% of participation". Given more collaboration by an increased number of people, even more solutions, ideas and theories could be presented and analyzed. Badges have the potential to work for any company or online collaborative action system in order to engage more people and motivate those people to participate in online data sharing and social media.

Badges "enhance identity and reputation, raising profiles within learning communities and among peers by aggregating identities across other communities... [and] build community and social capital by helping learners find peers and mentors with similar interests. Community badges help formalize camaraderie, team synthesis, and communities of practice". Badges quantify the soft skills of teamwork that are pivotal to success in many professions today.

Open Badges are used by organizations such as OER Commons to spur collaboration and resource sharing in their communities.

=== Recognition and assessment ===
Sometimes digital badges are used to recognize quality or provide for community approval. The "Good Housekeeping Seal of Approval" provides this in non-digital formats, but there are similar indicators of trust, for example, that indicate best practices in e-commerce. Sometimes such badges are indicators of awards, like the Webbies or Edublog Awards. Open Badges differ from more basic digital badges in that they allow an earner to represent, verify, and communicate their skills, interests and achievements across a wide array of learning systems.

In learning environments, badges have been used to encourage alternative, peer-based assessment. Badges can be associated with summative assessments of prior learning as well as formative assessment that provide guidance and feedback. They can also function as transformative assessment that shape existing learning or allow new ones to be created. Digital badges might be particularly useful as part of a formative assessment process, providing constant feedback and tracking of what has been learned and what the next step might be. Massive online open courses (MOOCs) and e-assessments, can be used to deliver content at scale, while providing structured points for formative assessment, connections to learning communities, and new possibilities for strengthening individual agency in the learning process. Such environments might leverage self- and peer-assessment, again as part of formative processes.

A drawback is that these types of assessment take time. However, strategies like peer review, interactive games or simulations, and self-administered tests might help in fragmenting assessment processes, while still providing essential feedback to the learner along the way. Also, as markers or benchmarks of learning, it is possible that digital badges might work particularly well for individuals who are stressed by testing, and for educators looking for mechanisms to accommodate differentiated learning pathways.

=== Implementation of Digital Badges ===
A double-loop learning process for the implementation of digital badges is recommended (Shields & Chugh, 2017). Inclusion of range of stakeholders at the design, implementation and review stages is recommended.

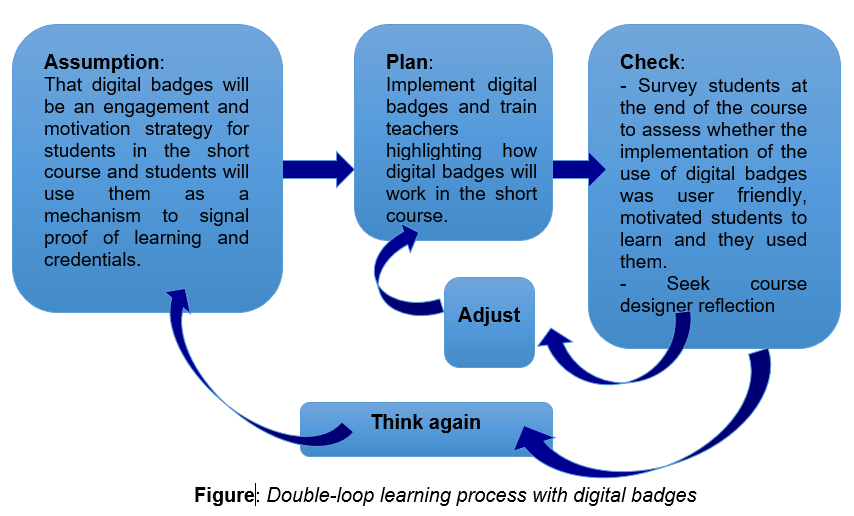
Double-loop learning process with digital badges (Shields & Chugh, 2017, pg 1822)

== Digital badging software ==
Digital badge management software helps to create, issue, store, and share digital badges that verify awardees' skills, and credentials. These platforms offer enterprise level security to ensure the badges are secure and private. Using a digital badge platform organizations can issue badges that save time and cost.

=== Alternative credentials ===
Digital badges are seen as a potential challenger to the dominant paradigm of diplomas in higher education. The Chronicle of Higher Education notes that more and more online educational websites are adopting badges to mark achievement.

With two-thirds of U.S. college or university students falling into the non-traditional category (meaning they aren't first-time, first-year students arriving on campus straight from high school), non-degree certificate programs will play an increasing role in providing post-secondary education opportunities.

One website utilizing badges for alternative credentials is Badges for Vets. It is a free website funded by the HASTAC/MacArthur that provides U.S. military veterans with a means to use Open Badges to indicate relevant military training and experience to prospective employers. Examples of available badges include translator, engineering construction, law enforcement and finance, and employers are able to browse the Badges for Vets database to match specific qualifications or find qualified veterans in their local community.

=== Representations of competencies ===
Digital badges can also be used as competency-based signifier of achievement, which is in contrast to traditional educational models that stress time-based quantification of education goals. Digital badges also have the ability to be more nimble than school curriculum that take time to create, change, and evolve.

Pearson Education, an early adopter of the Open Badges standard, cites a number of advantages to using badges to represent competencies, including the subjectivity of grades and the lack of transparency and granularity in traditional diplomas.

== Aggregation and exchange ==
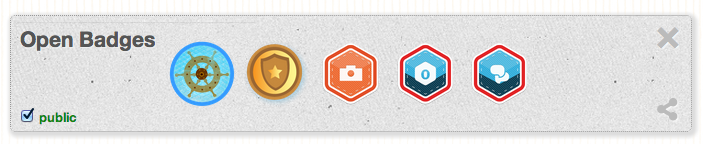
Showing a user's group of badges from the Mozilla Backpack.

Mozilla originally made available a service called the Mozilla Backpack that allowed users to aggregate and display their open badges. In late 2018, Mozilla announced that it would retire the Mozilla Backpack and migrate all users to Badgr. Prior to that, several attempts had been made to aggregate digital badges found on multiple sites.

== Criticism ==
There have been criticisms of the use of badges, suggesting that the functions described above come with significant risks. Some claim that the long history of physical badges in military and quasi-military settings might encourage similar hierarchical relationships when employed online. Badges have been criticized for rewarding tasks that are not inherently interesting to badge recipients because they are created to promote behavior that aligns with the goals of the badge issuer and not necessarily the badge recipient. Some critics have also observed that badges are a type of extrinsic motivator that could compete with an individual's intrinsic motivation for accomplishment and mastery. In other words, it is like giving out rewards for things that individuals or students should already be doing. Like with any system of rewards, it overall reduces students' motivation when the reward no longer becomes desirable.

One of the biggest criticisms of badges is their validity, and whether they can be viewed as "trusted credentials". Another criticism of digital badges is that the badge earner's performance is not directly observed so there could be some difficulty in making sure that the badge is awarded to the person who completed the assignment or met the specific criteria. Open Badges attempt to address these concerns by including the earner's email address in the badge and proving a verifiable link back to the issuer.

The "gamification" of education is also something that skeptics fear because they feel that students would only be concerned with earning the most badges rather than focusing on the material presented. Additionally, there could be a slew of badges that do not mean anything at all, for example, like earning a badge because your name starts with the letter A. The creation of these "meaningless" badges reinforces the issue of validity because now the badge earner needs to decipher which badges are valuable, and various institutions need to do the same.

== See also ==
- Microdegree
