= Mozilla Open Badges =

Digital badge standard

The Open Badges Project
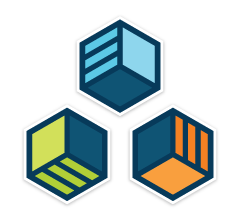
- Website: openbadges.org
- Launched: 15 September 2011; 15 years ago

Image files that contain verifiable information about learning achievements, Open Badges are based on a group of specifications and open technical standards originally developed by the Mozilla Foundation with funding from the MacArthur Foundation. The Open Badges standard describes a method for packaging information about accomplishments, embedding it into portable image files as a digital badge, and establishing an infrastructure for badge validation. The standard was originally maintained by the Badge Alliance Standard Working Group, but transitioned officially to the IMS Global Learning Consortium as of January 1, 2017. IMS rebranded to 1EdTech Consortium in 2022.

== History ==
In 2011, the Mozilla Foundation announced their plan to develop an open technical standard called Open Badges to create and build a common system for the issuance, collection, and display of digital badges on multiple instructional sites.

To launch the Open Badges project, Mozilla and MacArthur engaged with over 300 nonprofit organizations, government agencies and others about informal learning, breaking down education monopolies and fuelling individual motivation. Much of this work was guided by "Open Badges for Lifelong Learning", an early working paper created by Mozilla and the MacArthur Foundation.

In 2012, Mozilla launched Open Badges 1.0 and partnered with the City of Chicago to launch The Chicago Summer of Learning (CSOL), a badges initiative to keep local youth ages four to 24 active and engaged during the summer. Institutions and organizations like Purdue University, MOUSE and the UK-based DigitalME adopted badges, and Mozilla saw international interest in badging programs from Australia and Italy to China and Scotland.

By 2013, over 1,450 organizations were issuing Open Badges and Mozilla's partnership with Chicago had grown into the Cities of Learning Initiative, an opportunity to apply CSOL's success across the country.

In 2014, Mozilla launched the Badge Alliance, a network of organizations and individuals committed to building the open badging ecosystem and advancing the Open Badges specification. Founding members include Mozilla, the MacArthur Foundation, DigitalME, Sprout Fund, and Blackboard. More than 650 organizations from six continents signed up through the Badge Alliance to contribute to the Open Badges ecosystem.

In 2015, the Badge Alliance spun out of Mozilla and became a part of MacArthur Foundation spin off, Collective Shift - a nonprofit devoted to redesigning social systems for a connected world. Later that year, Collective Shift partnered with Concentric Sky to develop Open Badges 2.0. That same year, Concentric Sky launched the open source project Badgr to serve as a reference implementation for Open Badges. The Badgr Server is written in Python using the Django framework; source code is available under version 3 of the GNU Affero General Public License.

In early 2016, IMS Global announced their commitment to Open Badges as an interoperable standard for digital credentials, and in late 2016, Mozilla announced that stewardship of the Open Badges standard would transition officially to IMS Global.

In late 2018, Mozilla announced that it would retire the Mozilla Backpack program that enabled users to collect and showcase their Open Badge credentials and migrate all users to Concentric Sky's open source Badgr platform.

== Technical details ==
Open Badges are designed to serve a broad range of digital badge use cases, including both academic and non-academic uses. The core Open Badge specification is made up of three types of Badge Objects:

Assertion
Represents an awarded badge. It contains information about a single badge that belongs to an individual earner.
BadgeClass
Contains information about the accomplishment(s) a specific badge recognizes. As the same badge may be awarded to many earners, there may be many Assertions that correspond to a single BadgeClass.
IssuerOrganization
Contains a collection of information about the entity (e.g., person, organization) which issued a badge.

Beginning with version 1.1, valid JSON-LD must be used for Open Badges. Version 1.1 also adds Extensions, a structure that follows a standard format for collaboratively extending Badge Objects so that any issuer, earner, or consumer can understand the information added to badges. Any issuer may define and publish Extensions to include new types of metadata in badges. Any other issuer may use the same extensions to publish similar information in a mutually recognizable way.

An exploratory prototype draft xAPI vocabulary has been defined so that Open Badges may be referenceable from Experience API activity streams.
