= OpenBSD security features =

Security features as used in OpenBSD operating system

The OpenBSD operating system focuses on security and the development of security features. According to author Michael W. Lucas, OpenBSD "is widely regarded as the most secure operating system available anywhere, under any licensing terms."

== API and build changes ==
Bugs and security flaws are often caused by programmer error. A common source of error is the misuse of the strcpy and strcat string functions in the C programming language. There are two common alternatives, strncpy and strncat, but they can also be difficult to understand and easy to misuse, so OpenBSD developers Todd C. Miller and Theo de Raadt designed the strlcpy and strlcat functions. These functions are intended to make it harder for programmers to accidentally leave buffers unterminated or allow them to be overflowed. They have been adopted by the NetBSD and FreeBSD projects but not by the GNU C Library.

On OpenBSD, the linker has been changed to issue a warning when unsafe string manipulation functions, such as strcpy, strcat, or sprintf, are found. All occurrences of these functions in the OpenBSD source tree have been replaced. In addition, a static bounds checker is included in OpenBSD in an attempt to find other common programming mistakes at compile time. Other security-related APIs developed by the OpenBSD project include issetugid and arc4random.

== Kernel randomization ==
In a June 2017 email, Theo de Raadt stated that a problem with stable systems was that they could be running for months at a time. Although there is considerable randomization within the kernel, some key addresses remain the same. The project in progress modifies the linker so that on every boot, the kernel is relinked, as well as all other randomizations. This differs from kernel ASLR; in the email he states that "As a result, every new kernel is unique. The relative offsets between functions and data are unique ... [The current] change is scaffolding to ensure you boot a newly-linked kernel upon every reboot ... so that a new random kernel can be linked together ... On a fast machine it takes less than a second ... A reboot runs the new kernel, and yet another kernel is built for the next boot. The internal deltas between functions inside the kernel are not where an attacker expects them to be, so he'll need better info leaks".

== Memory protection ==
OpenBSD integrates several technologies to help protect the operating system from attacks such as buffer overflows or integer overflows.

Developed by Hiroaki Etoh, ProPolice is a GCC extension designed to protect applications from stack-smashing attacks. It does this through a number of operations: local stack variables are reordered to place buffers after pointers, protecting them from corruption in case of a buffer overflow; pointers from function arguments are also placed before local buffers; and a canary value is placed after local buffers which, when the function exits, can sometimes be used to detect buffer overflows. ProPolice chooses whether or not to protect a buffer based on automatic heuristics which judge how vulnerable it is, reducing the performance overhead of the protection. It was integrated in OpenBSD's version GCC in December 2002, and first made available in OpenBSD 3.3; it was applied to the kernel in release 3.4. The extension works on all the CPU architectures supported by OpenBSD and is enabled by default, so any C code compiled will be protected without user intervention.

In May 2004, OpenBSD on the SPARC platform received further stack protection in the form of StackGhost. This makes use of features of the SPARC architecture to help prevent exploitation of buffer overflows. Support for SPARC64 was added to -current in March 2005.

OpenBSD 3.4 introduced W^X, a memory management scheme to ensure that memory is either writable or executable, but never both, which provides another layer of protection against buffer overflows. While this is relatively easy to implement on a platform like x86-64, which has hardware support for the NX bit, OpenBSD is one of the few OSes to support this on the generic i386 platform, which lacks built in per-page execute controls.

During the development cycle of the 3.8 release, changes were made to the malloc memory management functions. In traditional Unix operating systems, malloc allocates more memory by extending the Unix data segment, a practice that has made it difficult to implement strong protection against security problems. The malloc implementation now in OpenBSD makes use of the mmap system call, which was modified so that it returns random memory addresses and ensures that different areas are not mapped next to each other. In addition, allocation of small blocks in shared areas are now randomized and the free function was changed to return memory to the kernel immediately rather than leaving it mapped into the process. A number of additional, optional checks were also added to aid in development. These features make program bugs easier to detect and harder to exploit: instead of memory being corrupted or an invalid access being ignored, they often result in a segmentation fault and abortion of the process. This has brought to light several issues with software running on OpenBSD 3.8, particularly with programs reading beyond the start or end of a buffer, a type of bug that would previously not be detected directly but can now cause an error. These abilities took more than three years to implement without considerable performance loss.

== Cryptography and randomization ==
One of the goals of the OpenBSD project is the integration of facilities and software for strong cryptography into the core operating system. To this end, a number of low-level features are provided, including a source of strong pseudo random numbers; built-in cryptographic hash functions and transforms; and support for cryptographic hardware (OpenBSD Cryptographic Framework). These abilities are used throughout OpenBSD, including the bcrypt password-hashing algorithm derived from Bruce Schneier's Blowfish block cipher, which takes advantage of the CPU-intensive Blowfish key schedule, making brute-force attacks less practical.

In OpenBSD 5.3, support for full disk encryption was introduced, but enabling it during the installation of OpenBSD had required manual intervention from the user by exiting the installer and entering some commands. Starting from OpenBSD 7.3, the installer supports enabling full disk encryption using a guided procedure, not requiring manual intervention anymore.

To protect sensitive information such as passwords from leaking on to disk, where they can persist for many years, OpenBSD supports encryption of swap space. The swap space is split up into many small regions that are each assigned their own encryption key, which is generated randomly and automatically with no input from the user, held entirely in memory, and never written to disk except when hibernating; as soon as the data in a region is no longer required, OpenBSD discards its encryption key, effectively transforming the data in that region into useless garbage. Toggling this feature can be done using a single sysctl configuration option, and doesn't require any prior setup, disk partitioning, or partition-related settings to be done/changed; furthermore, there is no choice of encryption parameters (such as the algorithm or key length to use), as strong parameters are always used. There is no harm and no loss of functionality with this feature, because the encryption keys used to access swapped processes are only lost when the computer crashes (e.g. power loss), after which all operating systems discard the previous contents of the memory and swap anyway, and because hibernation continues to work as usual with this feature. This feature is enabled by default in OpenBSD 3.8 (released in November 2005) and later; OpenBSD and macOS, as of 2026, remain the only prominent operating systems to have swap encrypted by default independently of disk encryption and its user-provided password. (Windows requires toggling a configuration setting that is not presented in its user-facing Control Panel and Settings apps, and other operating systems, including FreeBSD, and every Linux-based distribution, rely on the existing disk encryption features to encrypt the swap, which often (a) need to be enabled by the user manually, (b) require setup (if disk encryption wasn't chosen during the operating system's installation) which is not as trivial to do as toggling swap encryption on OpenBSD, and (c) use the user-provided password, which users need to remember and could be weak/guessable or even extracted out of the users.)

The network stack also makes heavy use of randomization to increase security and reduce the predictability of various values that may be of use to an attacker, including TCP initial sequence numbers and timestamps, and ephemeral source ports. A number of features to increase network resilience and availability, including countermeasures for problems with ICMP and software for redundancy, such as CARP and pfsync, are also included. The project was the first to disable the plain-text telnet daemon in favor of the encrypted SSH daemon, in 1999, and features other integrated cryptographic software such as IPsec. The telnet daemon was completely removed from OpenBSD in 2005 before the release of OpenBSD version 3.8.

=== Signify ===
The OpenBSD project had invented their own utility for cryptographic signing and verification of files, signify, instead of using existing standards and software such as OpenPGP and GnuPG. The creator of the signify utility, Ted Unangst, wrote in 2015, speaking of OpenPGP and GnuPG: "The concerns I had using an existing tool were complexity, quality, and complexity." This is in line with the project's longtime tendency to reduce complexity, and in turn, reduce the probability of vulnerabilities existing in the software, and help the user understand the software better and make more security-educated decisions. signify is integrated into the base operating system and used for verification of all releases, patches, and packages starting with OpenBSD 5.5. In contrast, other Free Software operating systems and security-focused software tend to use OpenPGP for release verification, and as of 2022 continue to do so, including: Debian, a prominent operating system that's also used as a base for other operating systems, including Ubuntu; Kali Linux, a specialized operating system for penetration testing, security research, digital forensics, and reverse engineering; Qubes OS, a security-focused operating system; Tor Browser, an anonymous Web browser; SecureDrop, a software package for journalists and whistleblowers to exchange information securely and anonymously over the Internet; and VeraCrypt, a software program for on-the-fly encryption and full disk encryption.

== X11 ==
In X11 on OpenBSD, neither the X server nor X clients normally have any escalated direct memory or hardware privileges: When driving X with the Intel(4) or Radeon(4) drivers, these normally interact with the underlying hardware via the Direct Rendering Management(4) kernel interface only, so that lowlevel memory/hardware access is handled solely by the kernel. Other drivers such as WSFB follow a similar pattern. For this reason, X11 on OpenBSD does not open up lowlevel memory or hardware access to user/root programs as is done on some other systems, and as was done in the past, which then needed the user to escalate the machdep.allowaperture setting from its default zero setting, to an unsecure setting.

OpenBSD's version of the X Window System (named Xenocara) has some security modifications. The server and some of the default applications are patched to make use of privilege separation, and OpenBSD provides an "aperture" driver to limit X's access to memory. However, after work on X security flaws by Loïc Duflot, Theo de Raadt commented that the aperture driver was merely "the best we can do" and that X "violates all the security models you will hear of in a university class." He went on to castigate X developers for "taking their time at solving this > 10-year-old problem." On November 29, 2006, a VESA kernel driver was developed that permitted X to run, albeit more slowly, without the use of the aperture driver.

On February 15, 2014, X was further modified to allow it to run without root privileges.

After the discovery of a security vulnerability in X, OpenBSD doesn't support the running of X as a root user and only supports running X via a display manager as a dedicated _x11 user.

== Other features ==
Privilege separation, privilege revocation, chrooting and randomized loading of libraries also play a role in increasing the security of the system. Many of these have been applied to the OpenBSD versions of common programs such as syslogd tcpdump and Apache, and to the BSD Authentication system.

OpenBSD has a history of providing its users with full disclosure in relation to various bugs and security breaches detected by the OpenBSD team. This is exemplified by the project's slogan: "Only two remote holes in the default install, in a heck of a long time!"

OpenBSD is intended to be secure by default, which includes (but is not limited to) having all non-essential services be disabled by default. This is done not only to not require users to learn how and waste time to secure their computers after installing OpenBSD, but also in hope of making users more aware of security considerations, by requiring them to make conscious decisions to enable features that could reduce their security.

OpenBSD 5.9 included support for the then–new pledge system call (introduced in OpenBSD 5.8 as tame and renamed in 5.9 to pledge) for restricting process capabilities to a minimal subset required for correct operation. If the process is compromised and attempts to perform an unintended behavior, it will be terminated by the kernel. OpenBSD 6.4 introduced the unveil system call for restricting filesystem visibility to a minimum level. pledge and unveil are used together to confine applications, further limiting what they're otherwise permitted to do under the user account they're running as. Since the introduction of pledge, base OpenBSD programs (included out of the box in OpenBSD), applications (handled by their developers), and ports (of applications, handled by the OpenBSD team) have been updated to be confined with pledge and/or unveil. Some examples of third-party applications updated with these features (by their developers or in OpenBSD's app ports) include the Chromium and Firefox web browsers.
