= Virtual Switch Redundancy Protocol =

Computer network switching protocol

The Virtual Switch Redundancy Protocol (VSRP) is a proprietary network resilience protocol developed by Foundry Networks and currently being sold in products manufactured by both Brocade Communications Systems (formerly Foundry Networks) and Hewlett Packard. The protocol differs from many others in use as it combines Layer 2 and Layer 3 resilience – effectively doing the jobs of both Spanning Tree Protocol and the Virtual Router Redundancy Protocol at the same time. Whilst the restrictions on the physical topologies able to make use of VSRP mean that it is less flexible than STP and VRRP, it does significantly improve on the failover times provided by either of those protocols.

== See also ==
- Common Address Redundancy Protocol
- Hot Standby Router Protocol
