= Wizard of OS =

"The Wizard of OS"

Single by Plaid Tongued Devils
- Recorded: at Moxam Studios
- Genre: progressive rock
- Length: 10:08

For OpenBSD 3.7, released May 19, 2005, a theme song was made titled "The Wizard of OS". The song chronicled the OpenBSD developers' struggle to obtain open documentation for wireless cards and how manufacturers in Taiwan like Ralink and Realtek were the most cooperative of all the companies contacted. It was based on the work of Pink Floyd most notably in the style of their 1973 album The Dark Side of the Moon showing some similarities to "The Great Gig in the Sky", "Breathe" and "Eclipse". It is a parody of The Wizard of Oz.

It was for this effort which Theo de Raadt, the project's Benevolent Dictator for Life, received the FSF's 2004 Award for the Advancement of Free Software.

== Personnels ==
- Jonathan Lewis - lead vocals
- Adele Legere - female vocals
- Ty Semaka - lyrics, monkeys and laughing sounds
- Anita Miotti - little girl voice
- Reed Shimozawa - lead guitar
- Jonathan Lewis - drums, bass and all other sounds

The song was co-arranged by Ty Semaka and Jonathan Lewis (who also recorded, mixed and mastered the song).
