= OpenBSD Cryptographic Framework =

Cryptographic software in OpenBSD

The OpenBSD Cryptographic Framework (OCF) is a service virtualization layer for the uniform management of cryptographic hardware by an operating system. It is part of the OpenBSD Project, having been included in the operating system since OpenBSD 2.8 (December, 2000). Like other OpenBSD projects such as OpenSSH, it has been ported to other systems based on Berkeley Unix such as FreeBSD and NetBSD, and to Solaris and Linux. One of the Linux ports is supported by Intel for use with its proprietary cryptographic software and hardware to provide hardware-accelerated SSL encryption for the open source Apache HTTP Server.

== Background ==
Cryptography is computationally intensive and is used in many different contexts. Software implementations often serve as a bottleneck to information flow or increase network latency. Specialist hardware such as cryptographic accelerators can mitigate the bottleneck problem by introducing parallelism. Certain kinds of hardware, hardware random number generators, can also produce randomness more reliably than a pseudo-random software algorithm by exploiting the entropy of natural events.

Unlike graphics applications such as games and film processing where similar hardware accelerators are in common use and have strong operating system support, the use of hardware in cryptography has had relatively low uptake. By the late 1990s, there was a need for a uniform operating system layer to mediate between cryptographic hardware and application software that used it. The lack of this layer led to the production of applications that were hard-coded to work with one or a very small range of cryptographic accelerators.

The OpenBSD Project, which has a history of integrating strong, carefully audited cryptography into its operating system's core, produced a framework for the provision of cryptographic hardware acceleration as an operating system service.

== /dev/crypto ==
Application-level support is provided through the pseudo-device /dev/crypto, which provides access to the hardware drivers through a standard ioctl interface. This simplifies the writing of applications and removes the need for the application programmer to understand the operational details of the actual hardware that will be used. /dev/crypto was removed in OpenBSD 5.7, having been superseded by the crypto_ suite of syscalls.

== Implications for other subsystems ==
The OpenBSD implementation of IPsec, the packet-level encryption protocol, was altered so that packets can be decoded in batches, which improves throughput. One rationale for this is to maximize efficiency of hardware usage—larger batches reduce the bus transmission overhead—but in practice the IPsec developers have found that this strategy improves the efficiency even of software implementations.

Many Intel firmware hubs on i386 motherboards provide a hardware random number generator, and where possible this facility is used to provide entropy in IPsec.

Because OpenSSL uses the OCF, systems with hardware that supports the RSA, DH, or DSA cryptographic protocols will automatically use the hardware without any modification of the software.

== Backdoor allegations investigated ==
On 11 December 2010, a former government contractor named Gregory Perry sent an email to OpenBSD project leader Theo de Raadt alleging that the FBI had paid some OpenBSD ex-developers 10 years previously to compromise the security of the system, inserting "a number of backdoors and side channel key leaking mechanisms into the OCF". Theo de Raadt made the email public on 14 December by forwarding it to the openbsd-tech mailing list and suggested an audit of the IPsec codebase. De Raadt's response was skeptical of the report and he invited all developers to independently review the relevant code. In the weeks that followed, bugs were fixed but no evidence of backdoors was found.

== Similarly named Solaris product ==
Oracle's proprietary operating system Solaris (originally developed by Sun) features an unrelated product called the Solaris Cryptographic Framework, a plug-in system for cryptographic algorithms and hardware.

== See also ==
- OpenBSD security features
- Crypto API (Linux)
- Microsoft CryptoAPI
