= WMX =

WMX or Wmx may refer to:

- Wikimania 2014, the tenth Wikimania conference
- wmx, a version of wm2, a window manager
- Wamena Airport, the IATA code WMX
- wmx, the ISO 639-3 code for Womo language
- WrestleMania X, the tenth annual WrestleMania professional wrestling pay-per-view event

== See also ==
- WMX Technologies
