= Multipath (disambiguation) =

Multipath is the propagation phenomenon that results in radio signals reaching the receiving antenna by two or more paths.

Multipath may also refer to:

- Multipath I/O, in operating system input/output subsystems
- Multipath routing, in packet switching networks
- Multipath TCP, in computer networks

== See also ==
- Equal-cost multi-path routing
- Solaris IP network multipathing
