= IPMP =

IPMP may refer to:

- IP network multipathing, a facility provided by Solaris to provide fault-tolerance and load spreading for network interface cards
- Thymol, a chemical compound also known as 2-isopropyl-5-methylphenol
- Isopropyl methoxy pyrazine, an aroma compound produced by the Asian lady beetle
- Multipath I/O, the redundant IO technology
- MPEG-4, the Intellectual Property Management and Protection
- IVS Project Management Package, a Project Management Information System
