= VSRP =

VSRP may refer to:

- Visiting Students Research Programme, a summer programme organised by the Tata Institute of Fundamental Research
- Virtual Switch Redundancy Protocol, a computer network switching protocol
