= Cwm (window manager) =

Stacking window manager

cwm
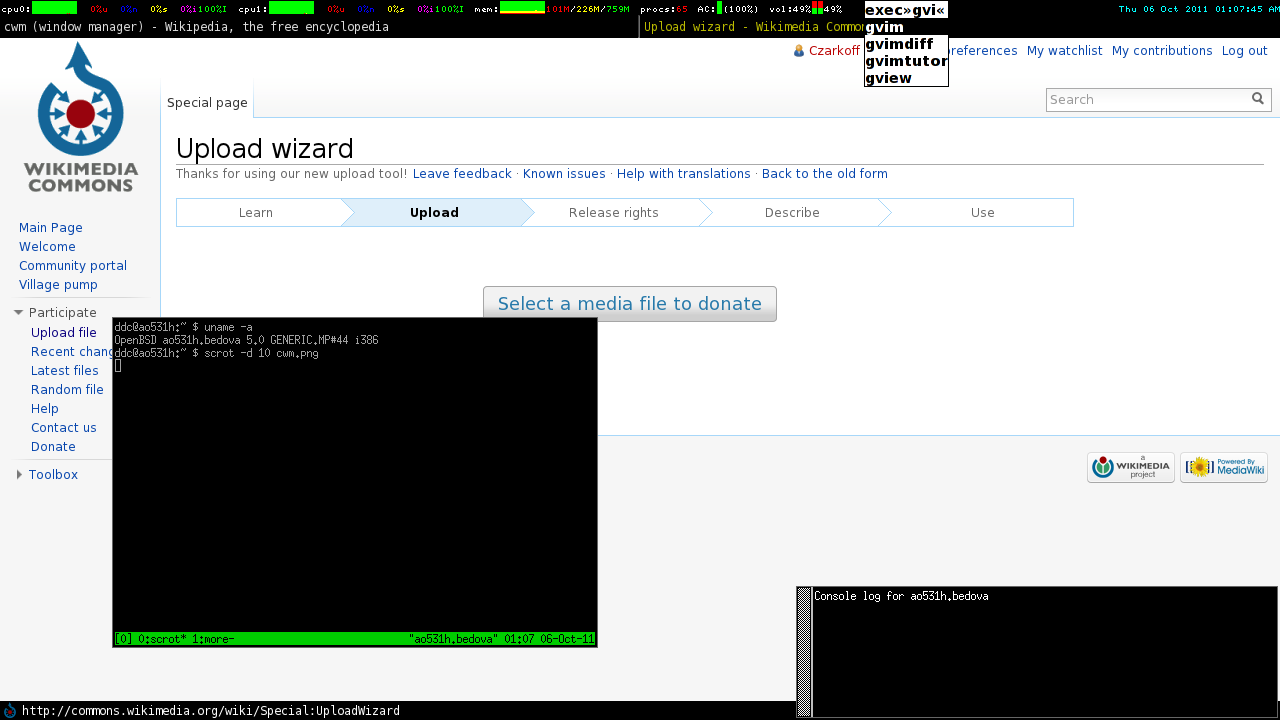
- cwm running on OpenBSD
- Original author(s): Marius Aamodt Eriksen
- Developer(s): Marius Aamodt Eriksen, Andy Adamson, Niels Provos, Martin Murray, Dimitris Economou, Antti Nykänen
- Initial release: 10 July 2004; 21 years ago
- Stable release: 3 / 28 August 2005
- Repository: cvsweb.openbsd.org/cgi-bin/cvsweb/xenocara/app/cwm/
- Written in: C
- Operating system: Unix-like
- Type: Window manager
- License: ISC License
- Website: cvsweb.openbsd.org/xenocara/app/cwm/

cwm (Calm Window Manager) is a stacking window manager for the X Window System. While it is primarily developed as a part of OpenBSD's base system, portable versions are available on other Unix-like operating systems.

== History ==
Development of cwm started from patches to evilwm by Marius Aamodt Eriksen. To ease the implementation of new features, cwm was eventually rewritten using some code from 9wm. The last release by the original author came out in August 2005.

In April 2007, cwm was imported into the OpenBSD source tree. By January 2008, a substantial part of the original source code, including all of the 9wm code, was rewritten.

cwm has been distributed with OpenBSD since version 4.2, where it replaced wm2. A third-party Linux port also exists.

== Description ==
cwm is a stacking window manager oriented towards heavy keyboard usage, small footprint and ease of use. While it lacks explicit virtual desktops functionality, it can be emulated by using the window groups mechanism. cwm does not draw window decorations except for a border around windows.

cwm includes several menus:

- exec menu (launch an application)
- window menu (search for a running application)
- ssh to menu (start a Secure Shell session)
- exec wm menu (switch to a different window manager)

All these menus operate in a "search as you type" manner.

cwm allows raising, hiding, switching between, and searching for windows using just the keyboard, making it suitable to use as terminal emulator multiplexer. Furthermore, it allows manipulating pointing devices, such as mice, with the keyboard.

Additional key bindings and configuration options can be specified in the configuration file ~/.cwmrc.

== Reception ==
cwm is generally well received in software minimalist communities.

cwm is noted to be used mainly due to its status as one of the default window managers in OpenBSD, though other reasons are sometimes cited. cwm is also praised for its flexibility, ease of use, and the fact that it can be used without a mouse.

== See also ==
- Comparison of X window managers
