= XZ Utils backdoor =

Patched software backdoor

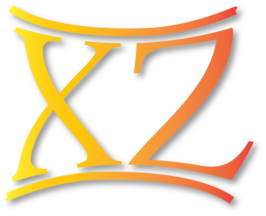
- Previous XZ logo contributed by Jia Tan

CVE-2024-3094
- CVSS 3.x score: 10
- CVSS 3.x vector: CVSS:3.1/AV:N/AC:L/PR:N/UI:N/S:C/C:H/I:H/A:H
- Date discovered: On or before 27 March 2024; 2 years ago
- Date of public disclosure: 29 March 2024; 2 years ago
- Date patched: 29 March 2024; 2 years ago (Note: The vulnerability was effectively patched within hours of disclosure by reverting to a previous version known to be safe.)
- Discoverer: Andres Freund
- Affected software: xz / liblzma library
- Website: tukaani.org/xz-backdoor/

On 29 March 2024, a malicious backdoor was discovered in the compression software XZ Utils. The backdoor gives an attacker who possesses a specific private key the ability to remotely execute code on an affected system through OpenSSH, a set of networking utilities. The backdoor was discovered by software developer Andres Freund.

It was later discovered that the exploit was deliberately included in the software in February 2024 by a user going by the name of "Jia Tan", affecting both versions 5.6.0 and 5.6.1. The issue was given the CVE number CVE-2024-3094 and was assigned a CVSS score of 10.0, the highest possible score, indicating that the exploit was extremely severe.

While XZ Utils is present in most Linux distributions, at the time of discovery the affected versions had not yet been widely deployed to production systems, but were present in development versions of major distributions, resulting in distribution maintainers rebuilding their packages to mitigate the exploit. A patch for this backdoor was released on 29 May 2024, with version number 5.6.2. The exploit was noted for its high level of obfuscation, being the result of a campaign lasting years.

== Background ==
Microsoft employee and developer Andres Freund reported the backdoor after investigating a performance regression in Sid, the unstable branch of Debian, a Linux distribution. Freund noticed that SSH connections were generating an unexpectedly high amount of CPU usage as well as causing errors in Valgrind, a memory debugging tool. He reported his finding to Debian and later to the Openwall Project, which brought it to the attention of various software vendors. Once the compromised version is incorporated into the operating system, it alters the behavior of OpenSSH's SSH server daemon by abusing systemd, (Note: systemd is an init system, meaning it is responsible for starting a Linux device and some administrative tasks.) allowing an attacker with a specific Ed448 private key to gain administrator access. According to an analysis by Red Hat, the backdoor can allow a malicious actor to gain full access to a system remotely.

The attacker made efforts to obfuscate the code, as the exploit delivery mechanism consists of multiple stages that act together. A subsequent investigation found that the campaign to insert the backdoor into the XZ Utils project was the culmination of over two years of effort, starting in 2021, by a user going by the name "Jia Tan". They used sock puppetry in a pressure campaign against the original maintainer of XZ Utils, eventually being given maintainer permissions on the project. This allowed them to introduce the exploit into version 5.6.0; due to it not being discovered at the time, it also made its way into version 5.6.1. Some of the suspected sock puppets include accounts with usernames like "Jigar Kumar", "krygorin4545", and "misoeater91". It is suspected that the names are pseudonyms chosen by the participants of the campaign. None have any sort of visible public presence in software development beyond the years of the campaign.

The backdoor was noted for its level of sophistication and the perpetrator's high level of operational security for a long period of time while working to attain a position of trust. American security researcher Dave Aitel suggested that it fits the pattern attributable to APT29, an advanced persistent threat actor believed to be working on behalf of the Russian Foreign Intelligence Service. Journalist Thomas Claburn suggested that it could be any state actor or a non-state actor with considerable resources.

== Mechanism ==
The malicious code is known to be in versions 5.6.0 and 5.6.1 of the XZ Utils software package. The malicious mechanism consists of two compressed files that contain the malicious binary code. These files are available in the Git repository, but remain dormant unless extracted and injected into the program. The code then replaces an existing function in OpenSSH with a malicious version. Under normal conditions, OpenSSH does not load code related to XZ Utils, as the programs are not related. However, a patch used by several Linux distributions causes OpenSSH to interface with XZ Utils by using systemd. A modified version of build-to-host.m4, a script used in the program's build process, was included in the release uploaded to GitHub. The modified script extracts another, resulting in code being injected into the program. This modified file was not present in the Git repository; it was only available from tar files released by "Jia Tan" separately from Git. The script appears to perform the injection only when the program is being built on an x86-64 Linux system that uses glibc and GCC and is being built via dpkg or rpm.

== Response ==
=== Remediation ===
On 29 March 2024, the US Cybersecurity and Infrastructure Security Agency issued a security advisory on the vulnerability (CVE-2024-3094) recommending that users and developers of the affected XZ Utils versions (5.6.0 and 5.6.1) roll back to a previous uncompromised version. Linux distributors, including Red Hat, SUSE, and Debian, reverted the affected packages to older versions. GitHub temporarily disabled access to the XZ project's repository and suspended the accounts of Jia Tan and Lasse Collin, the lead maintainer of XZ Utils. Collin's account was reinstated on 2 April 2024, and access to the repository was restored on 9 April 2024.

Canonical postponed the beta release of Ubuntu 24.04 LTS and its flavours by a week and opted to remove and rebuild all binary packages of the release, following the discovery of the malicious code in XZ Utils. Although no release version of Ubuntu was affected, development versions were. This precautionary measure was taken because Canonical could not guarantee before the beta release that the discovered backdoor did not affect additional packages during compilation.

After stopping the project's email forwarding to Jia Tan on 30 March 2024, regaining access to GitHub on 9 April 2024, and removing the backdoor from the repository, maintainer Collin released version 5.6.2 on 29 May 2024. Collin also published a write-up detailing the changes in code over time that allowed the backdoor to be added to the software.

More than a year later, in August 2025, researchers at the firmware security company Binarly found at least 35 Linux Docker images on Docker Hub that still contained the XZ Utils backdoor, including images maintained by Debian. The Debian development team declined to remove the affected images, stating that they were left for historical purposes, since they are old development builds that should not be used on real systems in place of newer, clean container versions.

=== Broader response ===
On 15 April 2024, the Open Source Security Foundation and OpenJS Foundation issued a joint warning that the XZ Utils backdoor "may not be an isolated incident", reporting that similar social engineering attempts had targeted JavaScript projects hosted by OpenJS. The foundations warned maintainers to watch for "friendly yet aggressive and persistent pursuit" by unknown community members seeking maintainer status.

Computer scientist Alex Stamos said that "this could have been the most widespread and effective backdoor ever planted in any software product", adding that, had the backdoor remained undetected, it would have "given its creators a master key to any of the hundreds of millions of computers around the world that run SSH". The incident also started a discussion regarding the viability of having critical pieces of cyberinfrastructure depend on unpaid volunteers.
