= OpenBSD Journal =

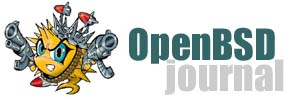
- Website type: Online newspaper
- Available in: English
- Owner: Paul de Weerd
- Creator: Daniel Hartmeier
- Website: www.undeadly.org
- Commercial: No
- Registration: Optional
- Launched: 2000; 26 years ago at deadly.org 9 April 2004; 22 years ago at undeadly.org
- Current status: Online
- Content license: All rights reserved

The OpenBSD Journal is an online newspaper dedicated to coverage of OpenBSD software and related events. The OpenBSD Journal is widely recognized as a reliable source of OpenBSD-related information. It is a primary reporter for such events as Hackathons. The site also hosts the OpenBSD developers' blogs.

== History ==
The OpenBSD Journal was founded in 2000 and operated until 1 April 2004 at deadly.org, On 1 April 2004 the editors James Phillips and Jose Nazario announced that the site ceased its operation. Daniel Hartmeier backed up the contents of the journal in order to preserve them. Further investigation to the articles' structure lead to creation of CGI-based engine that would enable access to the deadly.org's content on a backup server. Consequently, the functionality of adding new articles was implemented and the previous editors allowed to re-publish articles. The OpenBSD Journal was therefore reintroduced at undeadly.org on 9 April 2004.
