= OpenIKED =

Internet Key Exchange (IKEv2) daemon

- Original author(s): Reyk Floeter
- Developer(s): The OpenBSD Project
- Initial release: November 1, 2010; 14 years ago
- Stable release: 7.2 / December 1, 2022; 2 years ago
- Repository: github.com/openiked/openiked-portable
- Written in: C
- Operating system: BSD, Linux, macOS
- Type: Public key infrastructure
- License: ISC License
- Website: www.openiked.org

OpenIKED is a free, permissively licensed Internet Key Exchange (IKEv2) daemon developed as part of the OpenBSD project.
