= Fórum Internacional Software Livre =

Free software convention

FISL logo

Fórum Internacional de Software Livre (FISL) (International Free Software Forum) was an event sponsored by Associação SoftwareLivre.org (Free Software Association), a Brazilian NGO that, among other goals, seeks the promotion and adoption of free software. It took place in Porto Alegre, the capital of Rio Grande do Sul.

The event was meant as a "get-together" of students, researchers, social movements for freedom of information, entrepreneurs, Information Technology (IT) enterprises, governments, and other interested people. It was considered one of the world's largest free software events, harboring technical, political and social debates in an integrated way. It gathered discussions, speeches, personalities and novelties both national and international in the free software world.

== Event history ==
On 30 July 1999, a group of public servants, professors, students and members of the academic community, members of user groups and other interested people, joined efforts to start the PSL-RS (Free Software Project of Rio Grande do Sul).

The project's goals were:

- To set up a network of labs in companies and universities devoted to the study of Linux and other free software;
- To build a consortium to publish books and manuals about Free Software, Free Programming languages and such;
- To massively promote free software.

After much difficulty and many delays, the first FISL happened on 4–5 May 2000 in the Noble Hall of UFRGS (Rio Grande do Sul Federal University). The event was attended by 2,120 people, which also had the first WSL (Free Software Workshop) with 19 works presented during the event.

Among others, the first FISL had such notable attendees as Richard Stallman, writer of the "GNU Manifesto" and Founder of the Free Software Foundation.

Since then, the event has grown considerably in terms of visibility, influence and number of attendees.

=== FISL 18 ===
FISL 18 took place from July, 11 to 14, 2018, in the PUCRS Convention Center, Porto Alegre.

=== FISL 17 ===
FISL 17 took place from July, 13 to 16, 2016, in the PUCRS Convention Center, Porto Alegre. There were 3937 attendants.

=== FISL 16 ===
FISL 16 took place from July, 08 to 11, 2015, in the PUCRS Convention Center, Porto Alegre. There were 5281 attendants.

=== FISL 15 ===
FISL 15 took place from May, 07 to 10, 2014, in the PUCRS Convention Center, Porto Alegre. There were 6017 attendants.

=== FISL 14 ===
FISL 14 took place from July, 3 to 6, 2013, in the PUCRS Convention Center, Porto Alegre. There were 7217 attendants.

=== FISL 13 ===
FISL 13 took place from July, 25 to 28, 2012, in the PUCRS Convention Center, Porto Alegre. There were 7709 attendants.

=== FISL 12 ===
Presentation at 12th free & open source software conference in Porto Alegre, Brazil. Presented June 30, 2011

The 12th edition of the International Free Software Forum happened from June, 29 to July, 2, in 2011 and the main subject was "Net Neutrality", because it is believed that content must be equally accessible to every person with no interferences in online traffic. Following this edition's subject, a contest for choosing the event's logomark to be used in fisl's graphic work was carried out. Raphael Greque's work was chosen in an election between ASL's associates. Freedom as a subject also was present between various discussions, in an effort to contribute to technological and socio-cultural evolution of the country. It also aimed at offering to participants the opportunity to get updated in free software usage in many different areas. The event also offered attendance in many speeches and workshops in areas such as mobility, free software in education, robotics, free networks, free culture, digital inclusion and women in IT.

Representatives of both RS and national public sector attend fisl every year, and strengthen their commitment to free software. Hence the participation of the Brazilian president Luiz Inácio Lula da Silva, in 2009. In this edition, fisl hosted the presence of the Minister of Science and Technology Aloisio Mercadante, the RS Governor Tarso Genro and the Porto Alegre Mayor José fortunati, the President of the Federal Data Processing Service, Marcos Mazoni, the Manager of Technical Innovations of the Ministry of Planning Corinto Meffe, the Secretary of Logistics and IT of the Ministry of Planning, Delfino Natal de Souza, the President of the RS Data Processing Company (Procergs), Carlson Aquistapasse, the President of the Data Processing Company of Porto Alegre, (PROCEMPA), André Imar Kulczynski, federal deputies Paulo Pimenta and Manuela d'Ávila, besides other authorities.

Public Hearing – the Minister of Science and Technology, Aloizio Mercadante participated in a public hearing with fisl´ organizers, people from the Hacker Transparency movement, developers from Ubuntu, Debian, Slackware and ODF among other groups, talking about how hackers can help increase government's transparency and technological development.

FISL12 in numbers

Participants: 6.914 Brazilian states: 25 +Federal district Countries: 13 Users groups: 40 Convoys: 58 Tracks: 21 Proposals submissions: 581 Speeches: 352 Speakers: 521 Total traffic: 391 GB Wireless: 104 GB Traffic peak: 151 Mbit/s Max simultaneous hosts: 267 Page views: 311.922 Sponsors: 28 Solutions showed: 21 Supporters: 6 Exhibitors: 26 Organization team people: 217

=== FISL 11 ===
This editions happened from 21 to 24 July 2010. It hosted a total of 7.511 participants which circulated between the Free Solutions and Business Fair and fisl itself, attending speeches, workshops and debates. fisl11 developed more than 500 activities, overcoming all previous editions. Innovation began with speech selection, which relied on the participation of registered people in order to choose them. This was also the first edition with translation to libras (Brazilian language of signals, aimed at the hearing-impaired). The activities of the Free Culture Festival received a larger room, in an effort to broaden debates about knowledge sharing also in other areas of activity. Besides the record number of participants, 84 people helped build the largest free software event in Latin America together with organization teams. The presence of the traditional Convoys and Users Groups from various parts of Brazil and abroad confirmed the success, year after year. Up to the last day of the Forum, fisl11´ website had more than 2 million pageviews. Specialists in free software gave lectures in fisl11 such as Linux International Jon "maddog" Hall, developer Jon Phillips, Mozilla Foundation executive director Mark Shurman and GIT specialist Scott Chacon.

=== FISL 10 ===
This edition happened from 24 to 27, June, 2009, with names such as Jon "maddog" Hall, Peter Sunde, creator of the famous torrent sharing site The Pirate Bay. with 8232 registered participants, it was the largest edition ever. The picture of President Lula hugging Peter Sunde shot by Mariel Zasso was circulated in blogs around the world.

OBS: In this year the event's name in form of versions was abandoned, and a normal running number scheme was adopted.

=== FISL 9.0 ===
The 2008 edition had more than 7417 registered people coming from 21 countries. It became acknowledged by the presence of companies such as Sun Microsystems, Google and Intel and of personalities such as Linux International's Jon "maddog" Hall and Louis Suarez-Potts from OpenOffice.org. The event was carried on at the PUCRS Convention Center (PUCRS).

=== FISL 8.0 ===
The 2007 edition hosted the presence of companies such as Sun Microsystems, IBM and Intel and people like Jon "maddog" Hall from Linux International, X.Org's Keith Packard, Sun's Simon Phipps and Louis Suarez-Potts from OpenOffice.org. It harboured 5363 participants. The event happened at FIERGS Convention Center. 19 mobilizing activities to fisl 8.0 were carried on, among free software events, speeches, promotions, courses and institutional visits, between various Brazilian cities.

Among the outstanding attractions it may be quoted the participation of the educational coordinator from OLPC (One Laptop per Child) at the UFRGS Laboratory of Cognitive Studies Léa Fagundes, who introduced a prototype of the laptop developed for public school children. Paul Singer National Secretary of Solidarity Economy at the Ministry of Work and Employment and Edgar Piccino, from the Institute of IT, cabinet of the President of the Republic made a speech based on parallels between solidarity economy the development model of free software. In the panel "Digital Communication and the Building of the Commons: viral networks, open spectra and the new ways of regulation" the sociologist Sérgio Amadeu da Silveira, journalist Gustavo Gindre and Intervozes member João Brant and Jon "maddog" Hall debated the deep changes that digital technologies impose to the telecommunications sector.

=== FISL 7.0 ===
2006 edition happened from 19 to 22, April, and was marked by the presence of Richard Stallman and discussions around GPLv3. It is important to remark the discussions about digital inclusion, technical speeches about software usage and community meetings about communication and popular participation. More information can be found at the fisl 7.0 website.

A total of 3.385 people (83,82% men and 12,67% women), 445 speakers, 119 journalists and 550 exhibitors. Speakers from 10 countries participated.

=== FISL 6.0 ===
The 2005 edition had more than 4.300 registered people, according to the official website. The integration of new modules to the management system takes place. They are called GREVE and PAPERS.

In this year the event's organization decides to abandon the roman numbering system and adopt the "version" scheme. Aiming at helping indigenous and maroons communities from Rio Grande do Sul, a fee of R$3,00 (about US$1,62 as of dec-2011) was charged at registration. The funds gathered were used to buy food donated to these communities.

In the event's grid technical speeches, panels and cases in the banking, health, education, county management, hardware, networks and security areas were given, showing the strong evolution in applications that happened in the last years and trend analysis for the coming years.

A total of 2.715 people (82.96% men and 13.54% women), 222 speakers, 298 scholars, 81 journalists, 500 exhibitors have been participated and about 4.400 people have been to the fair. 23 countries were represented.

=== V FISL ===
V FISL happened from 2 to 5, June, 2004 at PUCRS. The system PAPERS comes up as an update to the old system. In the 2004 edition, the Forum gathered representatives from more than 35 countries, all the Brazilian states plus the Federal District. More than 300 speakers, 1.014 companies and institutions and 4.854 people.

=== IV FISL ===
The IV FISL happened at the PUCRS Convention Center from 5 to 7, June, 2003, in Porto Alegre.

With more than 4.000 people registered and the presence of famous speakers such as Sérgio Amadeu (then ITI President – Presidency of Brazil) and Miguel de Icaza (GNOME Foundation), the event had as a main subject Use of Free Software in the Private and Public Sector. It was the first edition to use an exclusive system for event management (called YES! Eventos).

=== III FISL ===
The 2002 edition happened from 2 to 4, May, at the PUCRS Convention Center. Main subjects were Use of Free Software in the public sector, testimonies and case studies about free software use in companies, tech tutorials and debates about free software diffusion in universities.

=== II FISL ===
The second edition of FISL took place from 29 to 31, 2001 at the Federal University of Rio Grande do Sul. The official opening ceremony was led by the Governor of Rio Grande do Sul and had the attendance of the President of the RS Deputy Assembly, Unesco, Mayors, Universities and NGO's. The main speech was about Software License and Freedom, from Timothy Ney, Free Software Foundation Executive – USA. Other subjects were private and corporate security, Free Software use in the armed forces and popular computers.

=== I FISL ===
The first edition of fisl happened from 4 to 5 May 2000, at the Federal University of Rio Grande do Sul (UFRGS). The main activities were case studies of free software use and free software concepts.

== Speakers ==
Among others, founders and important members of great Free Software projects that have spoken at FISL:

- Ralf Nolden: Maintainer of KDE's KDevelop IDE
- Amir Taaki: Bitcoin developer and founder of Bitcoin Consultancy.
- Jon "maddog" Hall: Executive Director of Linux International
- Larry Wall: Creator of the Perl programming language;
- Peter Salus: Author of "A Quarter Century of Unix" and "The Daemon, The Gnu and The Penguin"
- Rik van Riel: Linux kernel Developer
- Timothy Ney: GNOME Foundation Executive Director

The seventh Fórum Internacional Software Livre happened from the 19th to the 22nd of April. More than 5000 attendees registered attending.

The speakers included:

- Keith Packard
- Miguel de Icaza
- Marcelo Tosatti
- Jim Gettys
- Jim McQuillan
- Richard Stallman
- Georg Greve
- Aaron Seigo
- Zack Rusin

The 2nd international GPLv3 conference was held in conjunction with FISL on April 21 and 22.
