= Xenocara =

Modified X.Org Server for OpenBSD

- Original author: Matthieu Herrb
- Developer: The OpenBSD Project
- Release: 1 November 2007; 18 years ago
- Operating system: OpenBSD
- Type: Windowing system
- License: X11
- Website: www.xenocara.org
- Repository: cvsweb.openbsd.org/xenocara/

Xenocara is the OpenBSD build infrastructure for the project's customised X.Org Server that utilises a dedicated _x11 user by default to drop privileges and perform privilege separation in accordance to OpenBSD's "least privilege" policy.

Until release 6.9, X.Org used imake but recent modularised versions have switched to GNU autotools. Xenocara uses BSD make and is designed to ease building and maintenance of modularised X.Org within the OpenBSD CVS tree. It first appeared with OpenBSD 4.2, released on 1 November 2007 (18 years ago); before that, OpenBSD had a different build system and repositories for X in CVS, which have since been completely retired in favour of Xenocara.

Apart from X.Org, Xenocara builds several other projects, including window managers FVWM and cwm.

== Adoption ==
Xenocara is the default display server for the X Window System for:

- OpenBSD
- Hyperbola GNU/Linux-libre
