= Theo de Raadt =

Leader of the OpenBSD project (born 1968)

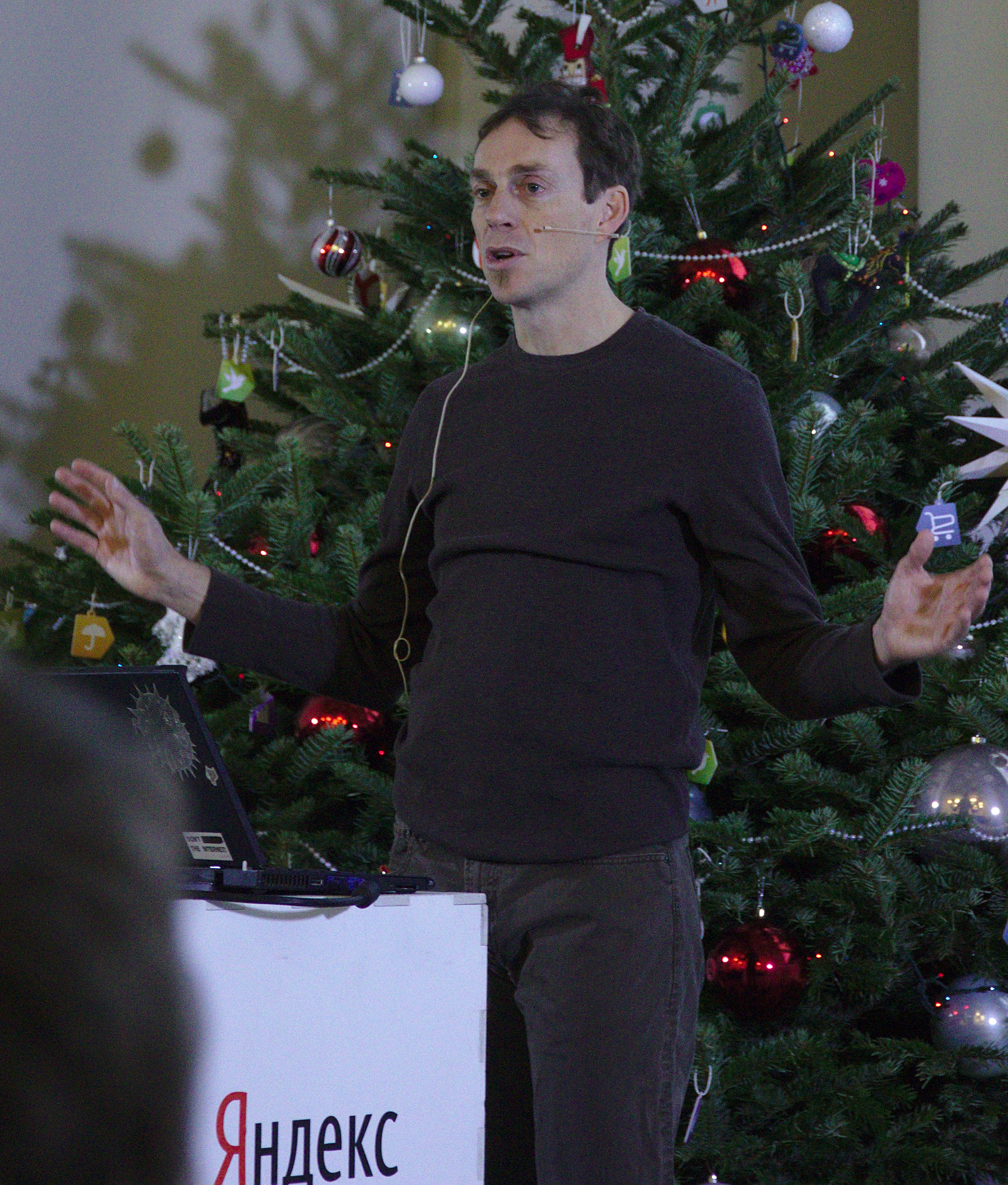
- De Raadt in 2013
- Born: 19 May 1968 (age 58); Pretoria, South Africa
- Education: University of Calgary
- Occupation: Software engineer
- Known for: NetBSD, OpenBSD, OpenSSH

Theo de Raadt (/də ˈrɔːt/ də RAWT, Dutch: [ˈteːjoː də ˈraːt]; born 19 May 1968) is a South African-born software engineer who lives in Calgary, Canada. He is the founder and leader of the OpenBSD and OpenSSH projects and was also a founding member of NetBSD. In 2004, De Raadt won the Free Software Award for his work on OpenBSD and OpenSSH.

== Early life ==
De Raadt is the eldest of four children to a Dutch father and a South African mother, with two sisters and a brother. Concern over the mandatory two-year armed forces conscription in South Africa led the family to emigrate to Calgary, Alberta, Canada in November 1977. In 1983, the largest recession in Canada since the Great Depression sent the family to the Yukon. Prior to the move, De Raadt got his first computer, a VIC-20, which was soon followed by an Amiga. It is with these computers that he first began to develop software. In 1992, he obtained a BSc in Computer Science from the University of Calgary.

== NetBSD ==
In 1993, De Raadt founded NetBSD with Chris Demetriou, Adam Glass, and Charles Hannum, who felt frustrated at the poor quality of 386BSD and believed an open development model would be better. 386BSD was derived from the original University of California Berkeley's 4.3BSD release, while the new NetBSD project would merge relevant code from the Networking/2 and 386BSD releases.

The new project focused on clean, portable, correct code, with the goal of producing a unified, multi-platform, production-quality BSD operating system.

The first NetBSD source code repository was established on March 21, 1993 and the initial release, NetBSD 0.8, was made in April 1993. This was derived from 386BSD 0.1 plus the version 0.2.2 unofficial patchkit, with several programs from the Net/2 release missing from 386BSD re-integrated, and various other improvements. In August 1993, NetBSD 0.9 was released, which contained many enhancements and bug fixes. This was still a PC-platform-only release, although by this time work was underway to add support for other architectures.

NetBSD 1.0 was released in October, 1994. This was the first multi-platform release, supporting the IBM PC compatible, HP 9000 Series 300, Amiga, 68k Macintosh, Sun-4c series and PC532. Also in this release, the legally encumbered Net/2-derived source code was replaced with equivalent code from 4.4BSD-lite, in accordance with the USL v BSDi lawsuit settlement. De Raadt played a vital role in the creation of the SPARC port, implementing much of the initial code together with Chuck Cranor.

== OpenBSD ==
In December 1994, De Raadt was forced to resign from the NetBSD core team, and his access to the source repository was revoked. Fellow team members claimed it was due to rude and abusive behaviour on the mailing lists.

In his book Free for All, Peter Wayner claims that De Raadt "began to rub some people the wrong way" before the split from NetBSD, while Linus Torvalds has described him as "difficult". Many have different feelings: the same interviewer describes De Raadt's "transformation" on founding OpenBSD and his "desire to take care of his team," some find his straightforwardness refreshing, and De Raadt remains widely respected as a hacker and security expert.

In October 1995, De Raadt founded OpenBSD, a new project forked from NetBSD 1.0. The initial release, OpenBSD 1.2, was made in July 1996, followed in October of the same year by OpenBSD 2.0. Since then, the project has followed a schedule of a release every six months, each of which is maintained and supported for one year.

== Outspokenness ==
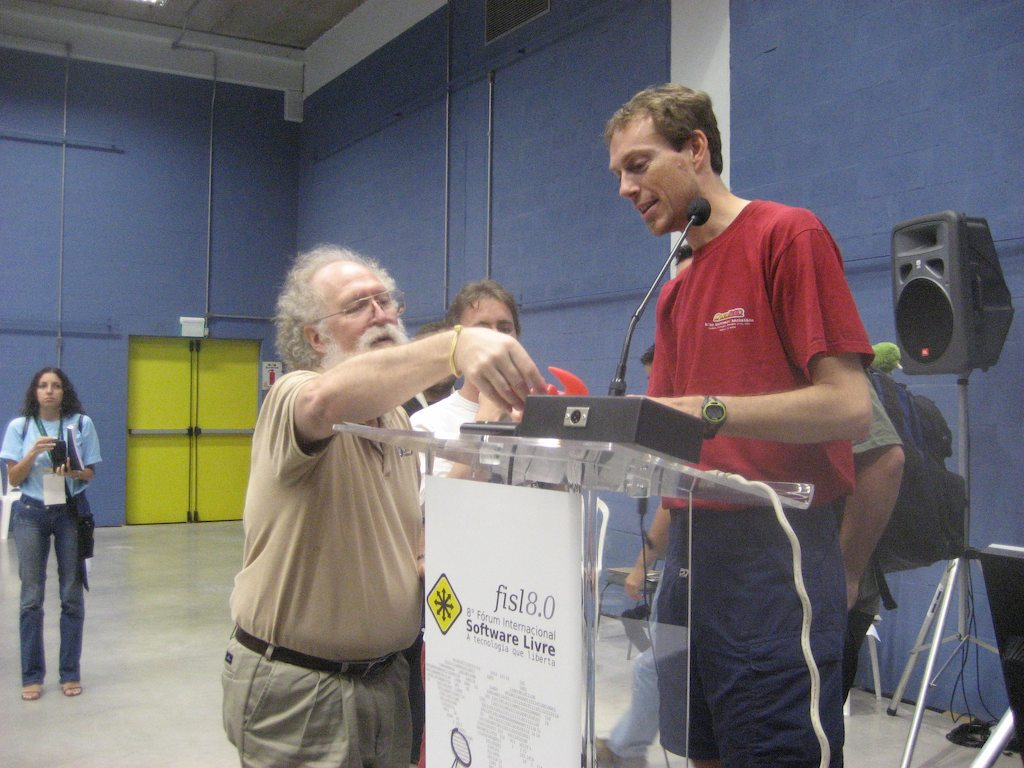
Jon "maddog" Hall presents De Raadt with daemon horns at FISL8

De Raadt has been a vocal advocate of free software since the inception of OpenBSD, but he has on occasion had rather public disputes with various groups, from Linux advocates to governments. This outspoken attitude, while sometimes the cause of conflict, has also led him to acclaim; De Raadt has given presentations at open source, free software and security conferences around the world, including FOSDEM in Brussels, Belgium, Usenix in San Antonio, Texas, U.S., AUUG Conference in Melbourne, Australia and FISL in Porto Alegre, RS, Brazil.

=== DARPA funding cancellation ===
After De Raadt stated his disapproval of the U.S.-led invasion of Iraq in an April, 2003 interview with Toronto's Globe and Mail, a multi-million-dollar US Department of Defense grant to the University of Pennsylvania's POSSE project was cancelled, effectively ending the project. Funding from the grant had been used in the development of OpenSSH and OpenBSD, as well as many other projects and was to be used to pay for the hackathon planned for May 8, 2003. Despite money from the grant already having been used to secure accommodations for sixty developers for a week, the money was reclaimed by the government at a loss and the hotel was told not to allow the developers to pay the reclaimed money to resecure the rooms. This resulted in criticism among some that the US military held an anti-free speech attitude. The grant termination was, however, not as bad a blow as some portrayed it. The project's supporters rallied to help and the hackathon went on almost as planned. The funding was cut mere months before the end of the grant, further fueling the speculations regarding the situation surrounding the grant's termination.

=== Free driver advocacy ===
De Raadt is also well known for his advocacy of free software drivers. He has long been critical of developers of Linux and other free platforms for their tolerance of non-free drivers and acceptance of non-disclosure agreements.

In particular, De Raadt has worked to convince wireless hardware vendors to allow the firmware images of their products to be freely redistributed. These efforts have been largely successful, particularly in negotiations with Taiwanese companies, leading to many new wireless drivers. De Raadt has commented that "most Taiwanese vendors give us documentation almost immediately," allowing open-source drivers to reliably support devices, as opposed to the lack of willingness from US companies like Intel and Broadcom to release firmware images free from licensing restrictions.

=== Clash with Linux developers ===
In April 2007, De Raadt was involved in a controversy involving the use of GPL code from the Linux bcm43xx driver in the BSD bcw driver. Linux developers accused the BSD community of infringing GPL code, but de Raadt denied infringement, arguing that the BSD driver was not "released". He also maintained that the conflict was not about GPL, but the way Linux developer Michael Buesch handled the situation. To Buesch's email, he responded:

It will be resolved in our tree, but it is up to him which way he does it. But when you approach issues like this with comments like "We'd like you to start contacting us to resolve the issue now" and your first mail is cc'd to a couple hundred people.... in the future, please think more carefully, ok?

Because right now, in that mail, you've pretty much done Broadcom's job for them. You've told the entire BSD community who may want to use a driver for this chip later, that because of a few GPL issues you are willing to use very strong words—published very widely—to disrupt the efforts of one guy who is trying to do things for them. And, you are going to do this using the GPL, even. You did not privately mail that developer. No, you basically went public with it.

That is how about half the user and developer community will see it.

They will see your widely posted mail as an overly strong position.

Another clash occurred in August 2007, when a group of Linux developers attempted to modify the license of dual-licensed ath5k driver. De Raadt summarised the issue as follows:

GPL fans said the great problem we would face is that companies would take our BSD code, modify it, and not give back. Nope—the great problem we face is that people would wrap the GPL around our code, and lock us out in the same way that these supposed companies would lock us out. Just like the Linux community, we have many companies giving us code back, all the time.

But once the code is GPL'd, we cannot get it back.
