= Plaid Tongued Devils =

Canadian musical group

- The Plaid Tongued Devils at Pilot's Monument, Yellowknife, NWT, Canada

Background information
- Genres: Alternative country, roma, klezmer, ska, rock, jazz
- Years active: 1990–present
- Members: Ty Semaka, Alan Kolodziejzyk
- Website: www.thedevils.com

The Plaid Tongued Devils are a Canadian musical group. Their music combines Roma, Klezmer, ska, rock, and jazz.

== History ==
The Plaid Tongued Devils began as an alternative country duet with singer Ty Semaka and guitarist Alan Kolodziejzyk in 1990. The group expanded to a five-piece band in 1992.

In 1996, the Devils began to develop a new style of music which they dubbed "romaklezkarock", combining Roma, Klezmer, ska, rock, and jazz. In 1997, they recorded the soundtrack for the musical Klezskavania, which was performed for the One Yellow Rabbit Theatre Company in Calgary.

The band's 2002 album, Belladonna, featured violinist Jonathan Lewis bassist Chipp Robb and percussionist John McNeil.

The group regularly tours in Canada and the Netherlands. Some members of the group have written and recorded songs for OpenBSD CD releases.

In December 2022, it was announced that band co-founder Alan Kolodziejzyk had died the previous month.

== Discography ==
- Running With Scissors - 1994
- Tongue and Groove - 1996
- In Klezkavania - 1998 (Also a theatre event)
- Belladonna - 2002
- Monsteroma - 2005
