= Pfsync =

Computer firewall protocol

- Repository: bxr.su/o/sys/net/if_pfsync.c

pfsync is a computer protocol used to synchronise firewall states between machines running Packet Filter (PF) for high availability. It is used along with CARP to make sure a backup firewall has the same information as the main firewall. When the main machine in the firewall cluster dies, the backup machine is able to accept current connections without loss.

== See also ==
- OpenBSD
- PF (firewall)
- CARP
- Linux-HA
- Linux Virtual Server
