= OpenSSH =

Set of computer programs providing encrypted communication sessions

OpenSSH or OpenBSD Secure Shell
- "Keeping your communiqués secret"
- Developer: The OpenBSD Project
- Release: 1 December 1999; 26 years ago
- Stable release: 10.6 / 6 October 2026
- Written in: C
- Operating system: Cross-platform
- Standard: RFC 4250, RFC 4251, RFC 4252, RFC 4253, RFC 4254, RFC 4255, RFC 4256, RFC 4335, RFC 4344, RFC 4345, RFC 4419, RFC 4462, RFC 5656, RFC 6594, RFC 6668, RFC 7479, RFC 9987
- Type: Remote access
- License: BSD, ISC, public domain
- Website: www.openssh.org
- Repository: github.com/openssh

OpenSSH (also known as OpenBSD Secure Shell (Note: "OpenBSD Secure Shell" name is mainly used in various sshd startup scripts.)) is a suite of secure networking utilities based on the Secure Shell (SSH) protocol, which provides a secure channel over an unsecured network in a client–server architecture.

OpenSSH started as a fork of the free SSH program developed by Tatu Ylönen; later versions of Ylönen's SSH were proprietary software offered by SSH Communications Security. OpenSSH was first released in 1999 and is currently developed as part of the OpenBSD operating system.

OpenSSH is not a single computer program, but rather a suite of programs that serve as alternatives to unencrypted protocols like Telnet and FTP. OpenSSH is integrated into several operating systems, namely Microsoft Windows, macOS and most Linux operating systems, while the portable version is available as a package in other systems.

== History ==
OpenBSD Secure Shell was developed by OpenBSD developers as an alternative to the original SSH software by Tatu Ylönen, which is now proprietary software. Although source code is available for the original SSH, various restrictions are imposed on its use and distribution. OpenSSH was created as a fork of Björn Grönvall's OSSH that itself was a fork of Tatu Ylönen's original free SSH 1.2.12 release, which was the last one having a license suitable for forking. The OpenSSH developers claim that their application is more secure than the original, due to their policy of producing clean and audited code and because it is released under the BSD license, the open-source license to which the word open in the name refers.

OpenSSH first appeared in OpenBSD 2.6. The first portable release was made in October 1999. Developments since then have included the addition of ciphers (e.g., ChaCha20-Poly1305 in 6.5 of January 2014), cutting the dependency on OpenSSL (6.7, October 2014) and an extension to facilitate public-key discovery and rotation for trusted hosts (for transition from DSA to Ed25519 public host keys, version 6.8 of March 2015).

On 19 October 2015, Microsoft announced that OpenSSH would be natively supported on Microsoft Windows and accessible through PowerShell, releasing an early implementation and making the code publicly available. OpenSSH-based client and server programs have been included in Windows 10 since version 1803. The SSH client and key agent are enabled and available by default, and the SSH server is an optional Feature-on-Demand.

== Development ==
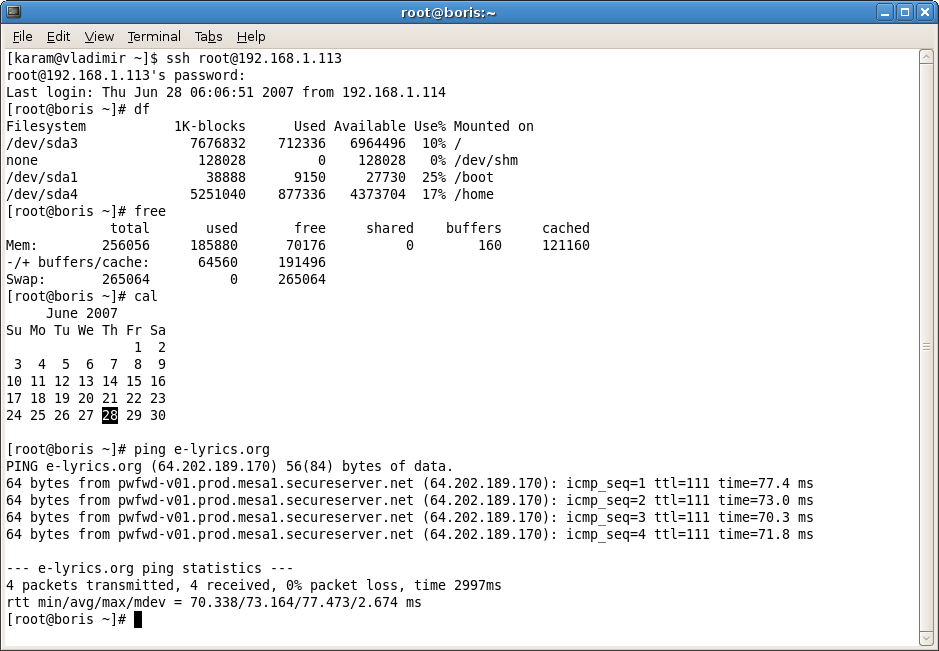
OpenSSH remotely controlling a server through Unix shell

OpenSSH is developed as part of the OpenBSD operating system. Rather than including changes for other operating systems directly into OpenSSH, a separate portability infrastructure is maintained by the OpenSSH Portability Team, and "portable releases" are made periodically. This infrastructure is substantial, partly because OpenSSH is required to perform authentication, a capability that has many varying implementations. This model is also used for other OpenBSD projects such as OpenNTPD.

The OpenSSH suite includes the following command-line utilities and daemons:

- scp, a replacement for rcp.
- sftp, a replacement for ftp to copy files between computers.
- ssh, a replacement for rlogin, rsh and telnet to allow shell access to a remote machine.
- ssh-add and ssh-agent, utilities to ease authentication by holding keys ready and avoid the need to enter passphrases every time they are used.
- ssh-keygen, a tool to inspect and generate the RSA, DSA and elliptic-curve keys that are used for user and host authentication.
- ssh-keyscan, which scans a list of hosts and collects their public keys.
- sshd, the SSH server daemon.

The OpenSSH server can authenticate users using the standard methods supported by the SSH protocol: with a password; public-key authentication, using per-user keys; host-based authentication, which is a secure version of rlogin's host trust relationships using public keys; keyboard-interactive, a generic challenge–response mechanism, which is often used for simple password authentication, but which can also make use of stronger authenticators such as tokens; and Kerberos/GSSAPI. The server makes use of authentication methods native to the host operating system; this can include using the BSD Authentication system or pluggable authentication modules (PAM) to enable additional authentication through methods such as one-time passwords. This occasionally has side effects: when using PAM with OpenSSH, it must be run as root, as root privileges are typically required to operate PAM. OpenSSH versions after 3.7 (16 September 2003) allow PAM to be disabled at run-time, so regular users can run sshd instances.

On OpenBSD, OpenSSH uses a dedicated sshd user by default to drop privileges and perform privilege separation in accordance with the principle of least privilege, applied throughout the operating system including the Xenocara X server.

== Features ==
OpenSSH includes the ability to set up a secured channel through which data sent to local, client-side Unix domain sockets or local, client-side TCP ports may be "forwarded" (sent across the secured channel) for routing on the server side; when this forwarding is set up, the server is instructed to send that forwarded data to some socket or TCP host/port (the host could be the server itself, "localhost"; or, the host may be some other computer, so that it appears to the other computer that the server is the originator of the data). The forwarding of data is bidirectional, meaning that any return communication is itself forwarded back to the client-side in the same manner; this is known as an "SSH tunnel", and it has been used to multiplex additional TCP connections over a single SSH connection since 2004, to conceal connections, to encrypt protocols that are otherwise unsecured, and to circumvent firewalls by sending/receiving all manner of data through one port that is allowed by the firewall. For example, an X Window System tunnel may be created automatically when using OpenSSH to connect to a remote host, and other protocols, such as HTTP and VNC, may be forwarded easily.

Tunneling a TCP-encapsulating payload (such as PPP) over a TCP-based connection (such as SSH's port forwarding) is known as "TCP-over-TCP", and doing so can induce a dramatic loss in transmission performance due to the TCP meltdown problem, which is why virtual private network software may instead use for the tunnel connection a protocol simpler than TCP. This is often not a problem when using OpenSSH's port forwarding, because many use cases do not entail TCP-over-TCP tunneling; the meltdown is avoided because the OpenSSH client processes the local, client-side TCP connection in order to get to the actual payload that is being sent, and then sends that payload directly through the tunnel's own TCP connection to the server side, where the OpenSSH server similarly "unwraps" the payload in order to "wrap" it up again for routing to its final destination.

In addition, some third-party software includes support for tunnelling over SSH. These include DistCC, CVS, rsync, and Fetchmail. On some operating systems, remote file systems can be mounted over SSH using tools such as sshfs (using FUSE).

An ad hoc SOCKS proxy server may be created using OpenSSH. This allows more flexible proxying than is possible with ordinary port forwarding.

Beginning with version 4.3, OpenSSH implements an OSI layer 2/3 tun-based VPN. This is the most flexible of OpenSSH's tunnelling capabilities, allowing applications to transparently access remote network resources without modifications to make use of SOCKS.

=== Supported public key types ===
OpenSSH supports the following public key types:

- ssh-dss (disabled at run-time since OpenSSH 7.0, released in 2015)
- ssh-rsa (disabled at run-time since OpenSSH 8.8, released in 2021)
- ecdsa-sha2-nistp256 (since OpenSSH 5.7, released in 2011)
- ecdsa-sha2-nistp384 (since OpenSSH 5.7)
- ecdsa-sha2-nistp521 (since OpenSSH 5.7)
- ssh-ed25519 (since OpenSSH 6.5, released in 2014)
- rsa-sha2-256 (since OpenSSH 7.2, released in 2016)
- rsa-sha2-512 (since OpenSSH 7.2)
- ecdsa-sk (since OpenSSH 8.2, released in 2020)
- ed25519-sk (since OpenSSH 8.2)

== Vulnerabilities ==
Before version 5.2 of OpenSSH, it was possible for an attacker to recover up to 14 bits of plaintext with a success probability of 2^{−14}. The vulnerability was related to the CBC encryption mode. The AES CTR mode and arcfour ciphers are not vulnerable to this attack.

A local privilege escalation vulnerability existed in OpenSSH 6.8 to 6.9 (CVE-2015-6565) due to world-writable (622) TTY devices, which was believed to be a denial of service vulnerability. With the use of the TIOCSTI ioctl, it was possible for authenticated users to inject characters into other users' terminals and execute arbitrary commands on Linux.

Malicious or compromised OpenSSH servers could read sensitive information on the client such as private login keys for other systems, using a vulnerability that relies on the undocumented connection-resuming feature of the OpenSSH client, which is called roaming, enabled by default on the client, but not supported on the OpenSSH server. This applies to versions 5.4 (released on 8 March 2010) to 7.1 of the OpenSSH client, and was fixed in OpenSSH 7.1p2, released on 14 January 2016. CVE numbers associated to this vulnerability are CVE-2016-0777 (information leak) and CVE-2016-0778 (buffer overflow).

On 29 March 2024, a serious supply chain attack on XZ Utils was reported, indirectly targeting the OpenSSH server (sshd) running on Linux. The OpenSSH code is not directly affected, as the backdoor is caused by the dependencies on liblzma via libsystemd that could be applied by various Linux distributions.

On 1 July 2024, the RegreSSHion security vulnerability was disclosed, which could enable a remote attacker to cause OpenSSH to execute arbitrary code and gain full root access. It was inadvertently introduced in prior OpenSSH version 8.5p1 in October 2020, and was patched following version 9.8/9.8p1.

In November 2026, a vulnerability dubbed "*sshole" or "SSHhole" (CVE-2026-123158) by Wakefield researcher Özgün Kültekin was disclosed. Anyone can gain root access by entering password longer than 256 bytes. This affects Linux systems with musl libc along with other specific conditions in the system's OpenSSH configuration.

== Trademark ==
In February 2001, Tatu Ylönen, chairman and CTO of SSH Communications Security informed the OpenSSH development mailing list that the company intended to assert its ownership of the "SSH" and "Secure Shell" trademarks, and sought to change references to the protocol to "SecSH" or "secsh", in order to maintain control of the "SSH" name. He proposed that OpenSSH change its name in order to avoid a lawsuit, a suggestion that developers resisted. OpenSSH developer Damien Miller replied urging Ylönen to reconsider, arguing that "SSH" had long since been a generic trademark.

At the time, "SSH", "Secure Shell" and "ssh" had appeared in documents proposing the protocol as an open standard. Without marking these within the proposal as registered trademarks, Ylönen ran the risk of relinquishing all exclusive rights to the name as a means of describing the protocol. Improper use of a trademark, or allowing others to use a trademark incorrectly, results in the trademark becoming a generic term, like Aspirin, which opens the mark to use by others. After study of the USPTO trademark database, many online pundits said that the term "ssh" was not trademarked, merely the logo using the lower case letters "ssh". In addition, the six years between the company's creation and the time when it began to defend its trademark, and that only OpenSSH was receiving threats of legal repercussions, weighed against the trademark's validity.

Both developers of OpenSSH and Ylönen himself were members of the IETF working group developing the standard; after several meetings this group denied Ylönen's request to rename the protocol, citing concerns that it would set a bad precedent for other trademark claims against the IETF. The participants argued that both "Secure Shell" and "SSH" were generic terms and could not be trademarks.

== See also ==
- Comparison of SSH clients
- Comparison of SSH servers
- SSH File Transfer Protocol (SFTP)
