= Solaris IP network multipathing =

Load spreading for network interface cards

The IP network multipathing or IPMP is a facility provided by Solaris to provide fault-tolerance and load spreading for network interface cards (NICs). With IPMP, two or more NICs are dedicated for each network to which the host connects. Each interface can be assigned a static "test" IP address, which is used to assess the operational state of the interface. Each virtual IP address is assigned to an interface, though there may be more interfaces than virtual IP addresses, some of the interfaces being purely for standby purposes. When the failure of an interface is detected its virtual IP addresses are swapped to an operational interface in the group.

The IPMP load spreading feature increases the machine's bandwidth by spreading the outbound load between all the cards in the same IPMP group.

in.mpathd is the daemon in the Solaris OS responsible for IPMP functionality.

== See also ==
- Multihoming
- Multipath routing
- Multipath TCP
- Common Address Redundancy Protocol
