= Wm2 =

Window manager

wm2
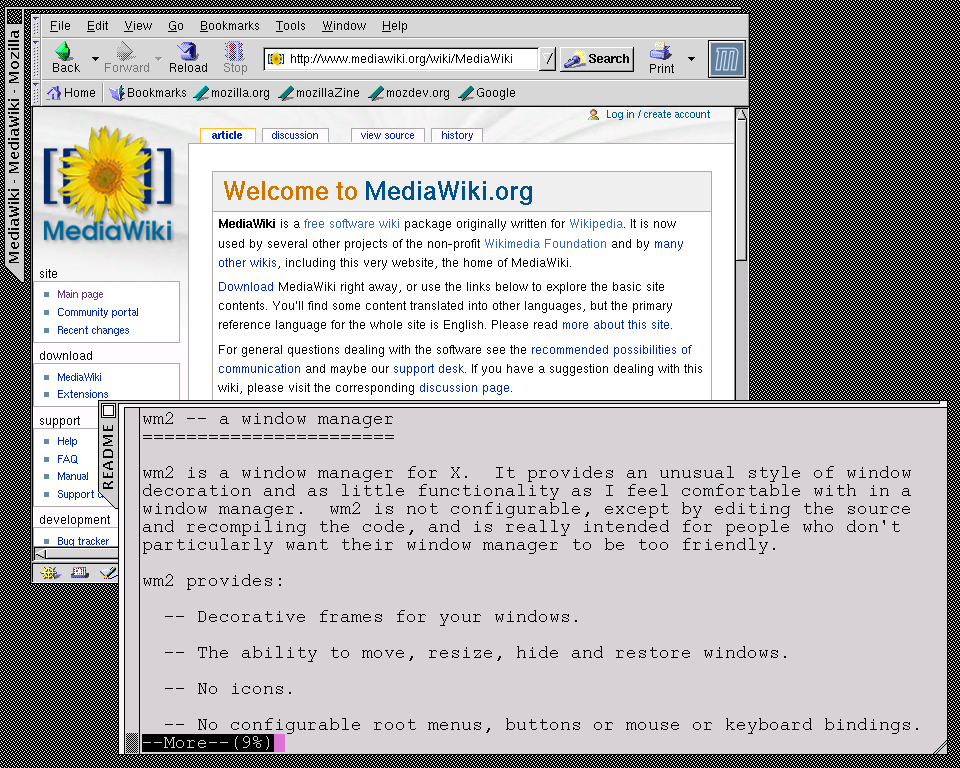
- Original author: Chris Cannam
- Stable release: 4 / 21 March 1997
- Written in: C++
- Operating system: Linux, Unix-like
- Type: Window manager
- Website: all-day-breakfast.com/wm2/

wm2 is a minimalist reparenting window manager for the X Window System written by Chris Cannam.

== History ==
wm2 was released around 1997 and was inspired by the window manager from the operating system Plan 9.

== Functions ==
wm2 was designed to have a simple set of features and be fast. It provides support for moving, resizing, and deleting windows, but does not support desktop icons, menus, toolbars, panels, or docks. Instead of icons, wm2 allows temporary hiding of windows from the desktop environment. Hidden windows can be recovered via a menu from the root window. It does not support interactive configuration, or provide a virtual desktop, and other features of modern window managers such as configurable root menus, toolbars, etc. Configuration options require editing and recompiling a source file and few options are available. wm2 is intended to be configuration free.

== wmx ==
wmx is a version of wm2 modified to add experimental features otherwise not supported in wm2.

== Reception ==
wm2 was noted as being "very spartan", "bare-bones", and minimalist, though opinions on it were positive as it is allows for easy access to X11 and window management without too much configuration. One author noted it used less memory than the other options he tried, getting it to run with only 0.7MB of memory.
