= Group (computing) =

Grouping of users as part of an access control system on a computer

In computing, the term group generally refers to a grouping of users. In principle, users may belong to none, one, or many groups (although in practice some systems place limits on this). The primary purpose of user groups is to simplify access control to computer systems.

For instance, a computer science department has a network which is shared by students and academics. The department has made a list of directories which the students are permitted to access and another list of directories which the staff are permitted to access. Without groups, administrators would give each student permission to every student directory, and each staff member permission to every staff directory. In practice, that would be very impractical – every time a student or staff member arrived, administrators would have to allocate permissions on every directory.

With groups, the task is much simpler: create a student group and a staff group, placing each user in the proper group. The entire group can be granted access to the appropriate directory. To add or remove an account, one must only need to do it in one place (in the definition of the group), rather than on every directory. This workflow provides clear separation of concerns: to change access policies, alter the directory permissions; to change the individuals which fall under the policy, alter the group definitions.

== Uses of groups ==
The primary uses of groups are:

- Access control
- Accounting - allocating shared resources like disk space and network bandwidth
- Default per-user configuration profiles - e.g., by default, every staff account could have a specific directory in their PATH
- Content selection - only display content relevant to group members - e.g. this portal channel is intended for students, this mailing list is for the chess club

== Delegable group administration ==
Many systems provide facilities for delegation of group administration. In these systems, when a group is created, one or more users may be named as group administrators. These group administrators are then capable of adding and removing other users from the group, without relying on a system administrator.

Some systems also provide joinable groups, which are groups to which users may elect to add themselves. Joinable groups are not intended to be used for access control, but rather for such purposes as electronic mailing lists.

== Static vs. dynamic groups ==
Many systems (especially LDAP systems) offer the facility of dynamic groups. Traditionally groups are static: one defines a group by individually selecting its members. In dynamic groups, however, an administrator can specify search criteria. All users which match the search criteria will be considered a member of this dynamic group.

For example, one might build an LDAP directory using source data from a student administration system. The student system could provide an attribute degreeCode, which might be a numeric code identifying the degree program in which the student is enrolled. Suppose then that degreeCode 55 is Bachelor of Computer Science. We could then define a group "BCS-Students" as "(degreeCode=55)" – having defined the group, we do not need to manually modify its membership – its membership will change automatically as updates flow through the system. One can construct even more complex definitions: "BCS-Students-1" could be "(&(degreeCode=55)(enrollmentYear=1))" (meaning: a user is a member of the 'BCS-Students-1' group if it's true they're enrolled in the BSC Computer Science degree program and they're in their first year – i.e., Computer Science freshmen).

== Roles ==
Some systems (e.g. Sun/Netscape/iPlanet LDAP servers) distinguish between groups and roles. These concepts are mostly equivalent: the main difference is that with a group, its membership is stored as an attribute of the group; whereas with roles, the membership is stored within the users, as a list of roles they belong to. The difference is essentially one of performance trade-offs, in terms of which type of access will be faster: the process of enumerating the membership of a given collection (faster for groups), or the process of enumerating which collections this user belongs to (faster for roles).

== See also ==
- Group (database)
- Group identifier (Unix) – Unix/POSIX system account group number; numeric value used to represent a specific group
