= XTI =

The term XTI can refer to the following:

- Leatherman Charge XTi, a premium multi-tool made by Leatherman
- XTI, the X/Open Transport Interface
- Canon Rebel XTi, the third generation Canon Rebel dSLR
