= AlphaBasic =

AlphaBASIC
- Original authors: Paul Edelstein, Dick Wilcox, Bob Courier
- Developer: Alpha Microsystems
- Initial release: 1976

AlphaBASIC is a computer programming language created by Alpha Microsystems in 1976. The language was written by Alpha Microsystems employees Paul Edelstein, Dick Wilcox and Bob Courier.

== Features ==
AlphaBASIC shares much in common with other BASIC languages. It does offer some fairly unusual features such as multi-user orientation, ability to control memory layout of variables (MAP statement), calling of external assembly language subroutines (XCALL statement). The language is designed for developers of vertical market software packages. The compiler and runtime system are written in Motorola 68000 assembly language, and thus are only able to run on Alpha Microsystems hardware. The compiler emits interpreter code.

== See also ==
- Amiga Basic
