= WD16 =

Microprocessor produced by Western Digital

Western Digital WD16
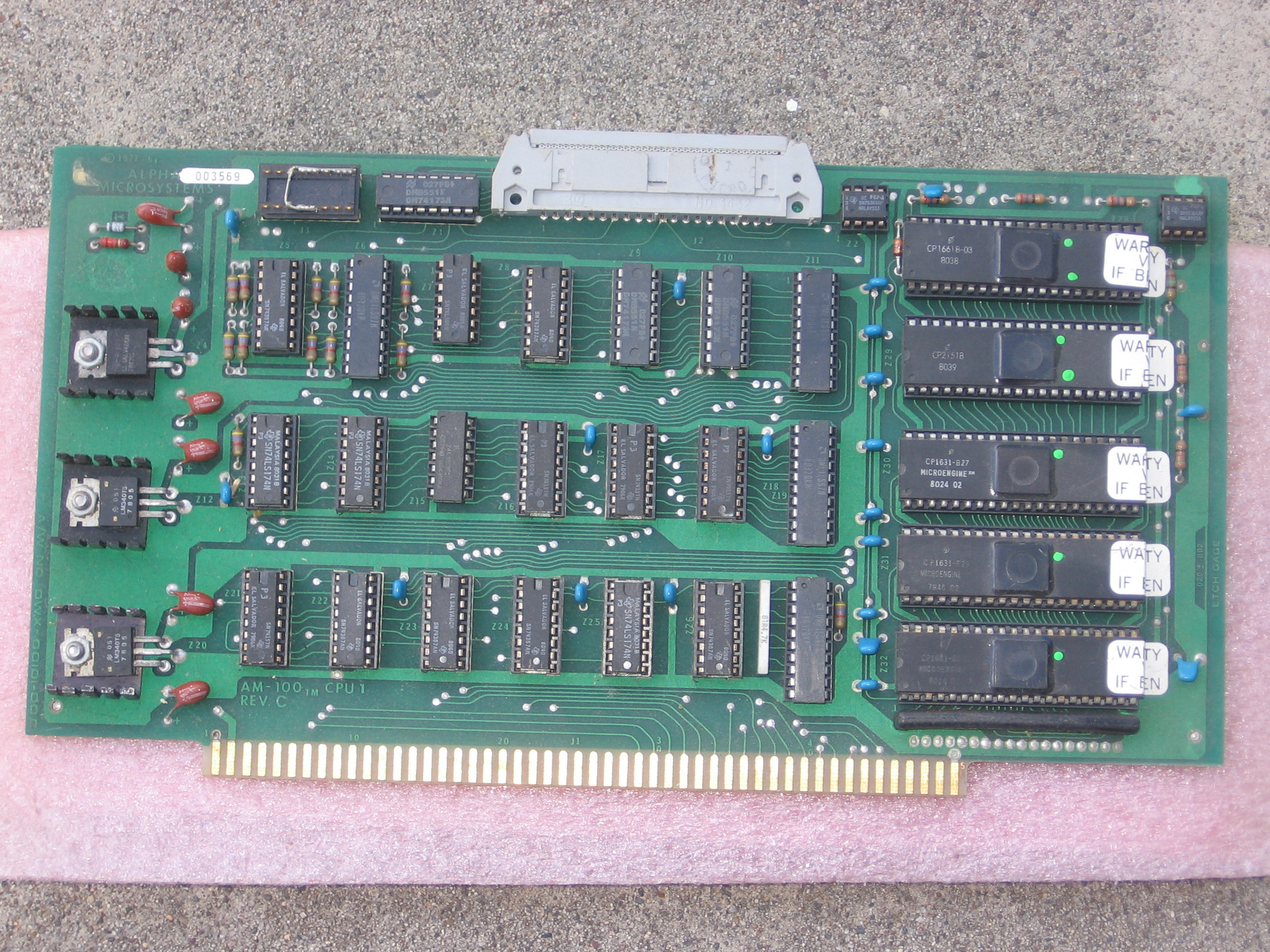
- WD16 microprocessor in five 40-pin packages installed on an Alpha Microsystems AM-100 CPU board which connects to a S-100 bus.

General information
- Launched: 1976; 50 years ago
- Common manufacturer: Western Digital

Performance
- Max. CPU clock rate: to 3.3 MHz
- Data width: 16
- Address width: 16

Physical specifications
- Package: 5 x 40-pin DIP

Architecture and classification
- Instruction set: PDP-11 like
- Number of instructions: 119

History
- Successor: none

The WD16 is a 16-bit microprocessor introduced by Western Digital in October 1976. It is based on the MCP-1600 chipset, a general-purpose design that was also used to implement the DEC LSI-11 low-end minicomputer and the Pascal MicroEngine processor. The three systems differed primarily in their microcode, giving each system a unique instruction set architecture (ISA).

The WD16 implements an extension of the PDP-11 instruction set architecture but is not machine code compatible with the PDP-11. The instruction set and microcoding were created by Dick Wilcox and Rich Notari. The WD16 is an example of orthogonal CISC architecture. Most two-operand instructions can operate memory-to-memory with any addressing mode and some instructions can result in up to ten memory accesses.

The WD16 is implemented in five 40-pin DIP packages. Maximum clock speed is 3.3 MHz. Its interface to memory is via a 16-bit multiplexed data/address bus.

The WD16 is best known for its use in Alpha Microsystems' AM-100 and AM-100/T processor boards. A prototype was demonstrated in 1977. As of 1981 there were at least 5,000 Alpha Micro computers based on the WD16. As late as 1982, WD16-based Alpha Micros were still being characterized as "supermicros." The WD16 was superseded by the Motorola 68000 in June 1982.

== CPU registers ==
WD16 registers
^{1}_{5}	^{1}_{4}	^{1}_{3}	^{1}_{2}	^{1}_{1}	^{1}_{0}	^{0}_{9}	^{0}_{8}	^{0}_{7}	^{0}_{6}	^{0}_{5}	^{0}_{4}	^{0}_{3}	^{0}_{2}	^{0}_{1}	^{0}_{0}	(bit position)
Main registers
R0																Register 0 / Count
R1																Register 1
R2																Register 2
R3																Register 3
R4																Register 4
R5																Register 5
Stack pointer
R6 / SP																Register 6 / Stack Pointer
Program counter
R7 / PC																Register 7 / Program Counter
Status flags
External status								ALU				N	Z	V	C	Processor Status Word

The CPU contains eight general-purpose 16-bit registers, R0 to R7. The registers can be used for any purpose with these exceptions: Register R7 is the program counter (PC). Although any register can be used as a stack pointer, R6 is the stack pointer (SP) used for hardware interrupts and traps. R0 is the count for the block transfer instructions.

== Memory ==
=== Data formats ===
The smallest unit of addressable and writable memory is the 8-bit byte. Bytes can also be held in the lower half of registers R0 through R5.

16-bit words are stored little-endian with least significant bytes at the lower address. Words are always aligned to even memory addresses. Words can be held in registers R0 through R7.

32-bit double words can only be stored in register pairs with the lower word being stored in the lower-numbered register. 32 bit values are used by MUL, DIV and some rotate and arithmetic shift instructions.

Floating point values are 48 bits long and can only be stored in memory. This format is half-way between single and double precision floating point formats. They are stored in an unusual middle-endian format sometimes referred to as "PDP-endian." Floating point values are always aligned to even addresses. The first word contains the sign, exponent, and high byte of the mantissa. The next higher address contains the middle two bytes of the mantissa, and the next higher address contains the lowest two bytes of the mantissa. The complete format is as follows:

1. A 1 bit sign for the entire number which is zero for positive.

2. An 8-bit base-two exponent in excess-128 notation with a range of +127, -128. The only legal number with an exponent of -128 is true zero (all zeros).

3. A 40 bit mantissa with the MSB implied.

	15	14	7	6	0
Addr+0	S	Exponent		Mantissa (high)

	15	8	7	0
Addr+2	Mantissa		(middle)

	15	8	7	0
Addr+4	Mantissa		(low)

=== Memory management ===
The WD16's 16-bit addresses can directly access 64 KB of memory. The WD16 does not offer any inherent memory management or protection. In the AM-100 application, the last 256 memory locations are mapped to port space. As most AM-100 computers were used as multi-user computers, the memory would usually be expanded past 64K with bank switching. Although the AM-100 could be configured for up to 22 users and 512 Kilobytes of RAM, a typical memory configuration for a 9-user AM-100 might be in the range of 352 Kilobytes. In 1981 an optional AM-700 memory management unit was offered for the AM-100/T which allowed memory segmentation in 256 byte increments.

== Addressing modes ==
Most instructions allocate six bits to specify each operand. Three bits select one of eight addressing modes and three bits select a general register. The encoding of the six bit operand addressing mode is as follows:

5	3	2	0
Mode		Register

In the following sections, each item includes an example of how the operand would be written in assembly language. Rn means one of the eight registers, written R0 through R7.

=== General register addressing modes ===
The following eight modes can be applied to any general register. Their effects when applied to R6 (the stack pointer, SP) and R7 (the program counter, PC) are set out separately in the following sections.

Code	Name	Example	Description
0n	Register	Rn	The operand is in Rn
1n	Register deferred	(Rn)	Rn contains the address of the operand
2n	Autoincrement	(Rn)+	Rn contains the address of the operand, then increment Rn
3n	Autoincrement deferred	@(Rn)+	Rn contains the address of the address of the operand, then increment Rn by 2
4n	Autodecrement	−(Rn)	Decrement Rn, then use the result as the address of the operand
5n	Autodecrement deferred	@−(Rn)	Decrement Rn by 2, then use the result as the address of the address of the operand
6n	Index	X(Rn)	Rn+X is the address of the operand
7n	Index deferred	@X(Rn)	Rn+X is the address of the address of the operand

In index and index deferred modes, X is a 16-bit value taken from a second word of the instruction. In double-operand instructions, both operands can use these modes. Such instructions are three words long.

Autoincrement and autodecrement operations on a register are by 1 in byte instructions, by 2 in word instructions, and by 2 whenever a deferred mode is used, since the quantity the register addresses is a (word) pointer.

=== Program counter addressing modes ===
When R7 (the program counter) is specified, four of the addressing modes naturally yield useful effects:

Code	Name	Example	Description
27	Immediate	#n	The operand is the next word of the instruction
37	Absolute	@#a	The address of the operand is the next word of the instruction
67	Relative	a	The address of the operand is the next word of the instruction added to the PC
77	Relative deferred	@a	The address of the address of the operand is the next word of the instruction added to PC

There are two common uses of absolute mode, whose syntax combines immediate and deferred mode. The first is accessing the reserved processor locations at 0000-003F. The other is to specify input/output registers in port space, as the registers for each device have specific memory addresses. Relative mode has a simpler syntax and is more typical for referring to program variables and jump destinations. A program that uses relative mode (and relative deferred mode) exclusively for internal references is position-independent; it contains no assumptions about its own location, so it can be loaded into an arbitrary memory location, or even moved, with no need for its addresses to be adjusted to reflect its location. In computing such addresses relative to the current location, the processor performs relocation on the fly.

Immediate and absolute modes are merely autoincrement and autoincrement deferred modes, respectively, applied to PC. When the auxiliary word is in the instruction, the PC for the next instruction is automatically incremented past the auxiliary word. As PC always points to words, the autoincrement operation is always by a stride of 2.

=== Stack addressing modes ===
R6, also written SP, is used as a hardware stack for traps and interrupts. A convention enforced by the set of addressing modes the WD16 provides is that a stack grows downward—toward lower addresses—as items are pushed onto it. When a mode is applied to SP, or to any register the programmer elects to use as a software stack, the addressing modes have the following effects:

Code	Name	Example	Description
16	Deferred	(SP)	The operand is on the top of the stack
26	Autoincrement	(SP)+	The operand is on the top of the stack, then pop it off
36	Autoincrement deferred	@(SP)+	A pointer to the operand is on top of stack; pop the pointer off
46	Autodecrement	−(SP)	Push a value onto the stack
66	Indexed	X(SP)	The operand is located X distance from the top of stack
76	Indexed deferred	@X(SP)	The pointer to the operand is located X distance from the top of stack

Although software stacks can contain bytes, SP always points to a stack of words. Autoincrement and autodecrement operations on SP are always by a stride of 2.

== Instruction set ==
Most of the WD16 instructions operate on bytes and words. Bytes are specified by a register number—identifying the register's low-order byte—or by a memory location. Words are specified by a register number or by the memory location of the low-order byte, which must be an even number. All opcodes and addresses are expressed in hexadecimal.

=== Double-operand instructions ===
The high-order four bits specify the operation to be performed. Two groups of six bits specify the source operand addressing mode and the destination operand addressing mode, as defined above. This group of instructions takes up 75% of available opcodes.

15	12	11	9	8	6	5	3	2	0
Opcode		Src		Register		Dest		Register

Opcode	Mnemonic	Operation
1000	ADD	Add: Dest ← Dest + Src
2000	SUB	Subtract: Dest ← Dest - Src
3000	AND	And: Dest ← Dest ∧ Src
4000	BIC	Bit clear: Dest ← Dest ∧ (-1 - Src)
5000	BIS	Bit Set: Dest ← Dest ∨ Src
6000	XOR	Exclusive or: Dest ← Dest ⊻ Src
9000	CMP	Compare: Src − Dest
A000	BIT	Bit test: Dest ∧ Src
B000	MOV	Move: Dest ← Src
C000	CMPB	Compare byte: Src − Dest
D000	MOVB	Move byte: Dest ← Src (Register dest sign-extends to bits 8-15)
E000	BISB	Bit set byte: Dest ← Dest ∨ Src

Some two-operand instructions utilize an addressing mode for one operand and a register for the second operand:

15	9	8	6	5	3	2	0
Opcode		Reg		Src/Dest		Register

The high-order seven bits specify the operation to be performed, six bits specify the operand addressing mode and three bits specify a register or register pair. Where a register pair is used (written below as "Reg+1:Reg") Reg contains the low-order portion of the operand. The next higher numbered register contains the high-order portion of the operand (or the remainder).

Opcode	Mnemonic	Operation
7200	LEA	Load effective address: Reg ← ea(Dest)
73C0	JMP	Jump: PC ← ea(Dest) (This is the same as LEA PC,Dest and shares the same opcode.)
7400	ASH	Arithmetic shift: if Src < 0 then Reg ← Shift-right(Reg, -Src) else Reg ← Shift-left(Reg, Src)
7800	XCH	Exchange: Reg ↔ Src
7A00	ASHC	Arithmetic shift combined (32 bit): if Src < 0 then (Reg+1:Reg) ← Shift-right((Reg+1:Reg), -Src) else (Reg+1:Reg) ← Shift-left((Reg+1:Reg), Src)
7C00	MUL	Unsigned multiply: (Reg+1:Reg) ← Reg × Src
7E00	DIV	Unsigned divide: Compute (Reg+1:Reg) ÷ Src; Reg ← quotient; Reg+1 ← remainder

=== Single-operand instructions ===
The high-order ten bits specify the operation to be performed, with bit 15 generally selecting byte versus word addressing. A single group of six bits specifies the operand as defined above.

15	6	5	3	2	0
Opcode		Src/Dest		Register

Opcode	Mnemonic	Operation
0BC0	SWAB	Swap bytes of word: Dest_{0-7} ↔ Dest_{8-15}
8BC0	SWAD	Swap digits of byte: Dest_{0-3} ↔ Dest_{4-7}
0840	CLR	Clear: Dest ← 0
8840	CLRB	Clear: Dest ← 0
0C00	COM	Complement: Dest ← (-1 - Dest)
8C00	COMB	Complement: Dest ← (-1 - Dest)
0C80	INC	Increment: Dest ← Dest + 1
8C80	INCB	Increment: Dest ← Dest + 1
0CC0	DEC	Decrement: Dest ← Dest − 1
8CC0	DECB	Decrement: Dest ← Dest − 1
0C40	NEG	Negate: Dest ← -Dest
8C40	NEGB	Negate: Dest ← -Dest
0B00	SET	Set: Dest ← -1
8B00	SETB	Set: Dest ← -1
0A80	TST	Test: Src ∧ Src
8A80	TSTB	Test: Src ∧ Src
0A00	ROR	Rotate right: C ← S_{0}; S_{0-14} ← S_{1-15}; S_{15} ← C
8A00	RORB	Rotate right byte: C ← S_{0}; S_{0-6} ← S_{1-7}; S_{7} ← C
0A40	ROL	Rotate left: C ← S_{15}; S_{1-15} ← S_{0-14}; S_{0} ← C
8A40	ROLB	Rotate left byte: C ← S_{7}; S_{1-7} ← S_{0-6}; S_{0} ← C
0B80	ASR	Arithmetic shift right: Dest ← Dest ÷ 2, sign preserved
8B80	ASRB	Arithmetic shift right: Dest ← Dest ÷ 2, sign preserved
0AC0	ASL	Arithmetic shift left: Dest ← Dest × 2
8AC0	ASLB	Arithmetic shift left: Dest ← Dest × 2
8D80	ADC	Add carry: Dest ← Dest + Cflag
8DC0	SBC	Subtract carry: Dest ← Dest - Cflag
0D00	IW2	Increment word by 2: Dest ← Dest + 2
0DC0	TJMP	Tabled jump: PC ← PC + (Dest), PC ← PC + @PC
0D80	TCALL	Tabled call: -(SP) ← PC, PC ← PC + (Dest), PC ← PC + @PC
0D40	SXT	Sign extend: Dest ← 0 - N flag
8D00	LSTS	Load processor status: PSW ← Dest
8D40	SSTS	Save processor status: Dest ← PSW

=== Single-operand short immediate instructions ===
The high-order seven bits and bits 5 and 4 specify the operation to be performed. A single group of three bits specifies the register. A four bit count field contains a small immediate or a count. In all cases one is added to this field making the range 1 through 16.

15	9	8	6	5	4	3	0
Opcode		Reg		Op		Count

Opcode	Mnemonic	Operation
0800	ADDI	Add immediate: Reg ← Reg + Count + 1
0810	SUBI	Subtract immediate: Reg ← Reg - Count - 1
0820	BICI	Bit clear immediate: Reg ← Reg ∧ (-1 - (Count+1))
0830	MOVI	Move immediate: Reg ← Count + 1
8800	SSRR	Right rotate multiple: Reg:C-flag ← Rotate-right(Reg:C-flag, Count+1)
8810	SSLR	Left rotate multiple: C-flag:Reg ← Rotate-left(C-flag:Reg, Count+1)
8820	SSRA	Right arithmetic shift multiple: Reg:C-flag ← Arithmetic-shift-right(Reg, Count+1)
8830	SSLA	Left arithmetic shift multiple: C-flag:Reg ← Arithmetic-shift-left(Reg, Count+1)
8E00	SDRR	Double right rotate multiple (33 bit): Reg+1:Reg:C-flag ← Rotate-right(Reg+1:Reg:C-flag, Count+1)
8E10	SDLR	Double left rotate multiple (33 bit): C-flag:Reg+1:Reg ← Rotate-left(C-flag:Reg+1:Reg, Count+1)
8E20	SDRA	Double right arithmetic shift multiple (32 bit): Reg:Reg+1:C-flag ← Arithmetic-shift-right(Reg:Reg+1, Count+1)
8E30	SDLA	Double left arithmetic shift multiple (32 bit): C-flag:Reg:Reg+1 ← Arithmetic-shift-left(Reg:Reg+1, Count+1)

=== Floating point instructions ===
The high-order eight bits specify the operation to be performed. Two groups of four bits specify the source and destination addressing mode and register. If field I = 0, designated register contains the address of the operand, the equivalent of addressing mode (Rn). If field I = 1, designated register contains the address of the address of the operand, the equivalent of addressing mode @0(Rn).

15	8	7	6	4	3	2	0
Opcode		I	SReg		I	DReg

Opcode	Mnemonic	Operation
F000	FADD	Floating add: Dest ← Dest + Src
F100	FSUB	Floating subtract: Dest ← Dest - Src
F200	FMUL	Floating Multiply: Dest ← Dest × Src
F300	FDIV	Floating Divide: Dest ← Dest ÷ Src
F400	FCMP	Floating Compare: Dest - Src

Opcodes F500 to FFFF are mapped to a fourth microm to implement eleven more floating point instructions. There is no evidence that this fourth microm was ever produced. When a standard WD16 processor executes opcodes F500 to FFFF, the reserved opcode trap is taken, loading PC from 001A.

=== Block transfer instructions ===
The high-order ten bits specify the operation to be performed. Two groups of three bits specify the source and destination registers. In all cases the source register contains the address of the first word or byte of memory to be moved, and the destination register contains the address of the first word or byte of memory to receive the data being moved. The number of words or bytes being moved is contained in R0 as a unsigned integer. The count ranges from 1–65536. These instructions are fully interruptible.

15	6	5	3	2	0
Opcode		SReg		DReg

Opcode	Mnemonic	Operation
0E00	MBWU	Move block of words up: (DReg) ← (SReg), SReg ← SReg + 2, DReg ← DReg + 2, R0 ← R0 - 1, until R0 = 0
0E40	MBWD	Move block of words down: (DReg) ← (SReg), SReg ← SReg - 2, DReg ← DReg - 2, R0 ← R0 - 1, until R0 = 0
0E80	MBBU	Move block of bytes up: (DReg) ← (SReg), SReg ← SReg + 1, DReg ← DReg + 1, R0 ← R0 - 1, until R0 = 0
0EC0	MBBD	Move block of bytes down: (DReg) ← (SReg), SReg ← SReg - 1, DReg ← DReg - 1, R0 ← R0 - 1, until R0 = 0
0F00	MBWA	Move block of words to address: (DReg) ← (SReg), SReg ← SReg + 2, R0 ← R0 - 1, until R0 = 0
0F40	MBBA	Move block of bytes to address: (DReg) ← (SReg), SReg ← SReg + 1, R0 ← R0 - 1, until R0 = 0
0F80	MABW	Move address to block of words: (DReg) ← (SReg), DReg ← DReg + 2, R0 ← R0 - 1, until R0 = 0
0FC0	MABB	Move address to block of bytes: (DReg) ← (SReg), DReg ← DReg + 1, R0 ← R0 - 1, until R0 = 0

=== Branch instructions ===
The high-order byte of the instruction specifies the operation. The low-order byte is a signed word offset relative to the current location of the program counter. This allows for forward and reverse branches in code. Maximum branch range is +128, -127 words from the branch op code.

In most branch instructions, whether the branch is taken is based on the state of the condition codes. A branch instruction is typically preceded by a two-operand CMP (compare) or BIT (bit test) or a one-operand TST (test) instruction. Arithmetic and logic instructions also set the condition codes. In contrast to Intel processors in the x86 architecture, MOV instructions set them too, so a branch instruction could be used to branch depending on whether the value moved is zero or negative.

15	8	7	0
Opcode		Offset

Opcode	Mnemonic	Condition or Operation
0100	BR	Branch always PC ← PC + (2 × Sign-extend(Offset))
0200	BNE	Branch if not equal Z = 0
0300	BEQ	Branch if equal Z = 1
0400	BGE	Branch if greater than or equal (N ⊻ V) = 0
0500	BLT	Branch if less than (N ⊻ V) = 1
0600	BGT	Branch if greater than (Z ∨ (N ⊻ V)) = 0
0700	BLE	Branch if less than or equal (Z ∨ (N ⊻ V)) = 1
8000	BPL	Branch if plus N = 0
8100	BMI	Branch if minus N = 1
8200	BHI	Branch if higher (C ∨ Z) = 0
8300	BLOS	Branch if lower or same (C ∨ Z) = 1
8400	BVC	Branch if overflow clear V = 0
8500	BVS	Branch if overflow set V = 1
8600	BCC or BHIS	Branch if carry clear, or Branch if higher or same C = 0
8700	BCS or BLO	Branch if carry set, or Branch if lower C = 1

The limited range of the branch instructions meant that as code grows, the target addresses of some branches may become unreachable. The programmer would change the one-word Bcc to the two-word JMP instruction. As JMP has no conditional forms, the programmer would change the Bcc to its opposite sense to branch around the JMP.

15	9	8	6	5	0
Opcode		Reg		Offset

Opcode	Mnemonic	Operation
7600	SOB	Subtract One and Branch: Reg ← Reg - 1; if Reg ≠ 0 then PC ← PC - (2 × Offset)

SOB (Subtract One and Branch) is another conditional branch instruction. The specified register is decremented by 1 and if the result is not zero, a reverse branch is taken based on the 6-bit word offset.

=== Subroutine instructions ===
15	9	8	6	5	3	2	0
Opcode		Reg		Src		Register

Opcode	Mnemonic	Operation
7000	JSR	Jump to subroutine: -(SP) ← Reg; Reg ← PC; PC ← Src

JSR calls a subroutine. A group of six bits specifies the addressing mode. The JSR instruction can save any register on the stack. Programs that do not need this feature specify PC as the register (JSR PC, address) and the subroutine returns using RTN PC. If a routine is called with, for example JSR R4, address, then the old value of R4 would be saved on the top of the stack and the return address (just after JSR) would be in R4. This lets the routine gain access to values coded in-line by specifying (R4)+ or to in-line pointers by specifying @(R4)+. The autoincrementation moves past these data, to the point at which the caller's code resumes. Such a routine would specify RTN R4 to return to its caller.

The JSR PC,@(SP)+ form can be used to implement coroutines. Initially, the entry address of the coroutine is placed on the stack and from that point the JSR PC,@(SP)+ instruction is used for both the call and the return statements. The result of this JSR instruction is to exchange the contents of the PC and the top element of the stack, and so permit the two routines to swap control and resume operation where each was terminated by the previous swap.

15	3	2	0
Opcode		Reg

Opcode	Mnemonic	Operation
0018	RTN	Return from subroutine: PC ← Reg; Reg ← (SP)+
0028	PRTN	Pop stack and return: SP ← SP + (2 × @SP), PC ← Reg; Reg ← (SP)+

PRTN deletes a number of parameters from the stack and returns. PRTN is the WD16's answer to the PDP-11's convoluted MARK instruction. Unlike MARK, PRTN executes in program space and can use any register as a linkage register. For this explanation, R5 will be used as the linkage. First, the caller pushes R5 on the stack. Next, any number of word arguments may be placed on the stack. The caller then puts the number of argument words + 1 into R5. The caller executes a JSR R5,address instruction which pushes the number of argument words + 1 onto the stack, places the return address in R5, and jumps to the subroutine. After executing its code, the subroutine terminates with a PRTN R5. PRTN doubles the number on the top of stack and adds it to SP, deleting the parameters. PRTN then continues by returning to caller with the equivalent of an RTN R5, loading R5 into PC and popping R5.

=== Single register instructions ===
These instructions have a 13 bit opcode and a three bit register argument.

15	3	2	0
Opcode		Reg

Opcode	Mnemonic	Operation
0010	IAK	Interrupt acknowledge: Interrupt acknowledge state code, Reg ← Bus read
0020	MSKO	Mask out: (002E) ← Reg, Mask out state code

=== Implied parameter instructions ===
15	0
Opcode

Opcode	Mnemonic	Operation
0000	NOP	No operation: Do nothing
0001	RESET	Reset: Transmit reset pulse to I/O devices
0002	IEN	Interrupt enable: I2 ← 1
0003	IDS	Interrupt disable: I2 ← 0
0004	HALT	Halt: Executes the selected halt option
0005	XCT	Execute single instruction: PC ← (SP)+, PS ← (SP)+, set trace flag, execute opcode, -(SP) ← PS, -(SP) ← PC, trace flag reset, If no error PC ← (0020) else PC ← (001E)
0006	BPT	Breakpoint trap:-(SP) ← PS, -(SP) ← PC, PC ← (002C)
0007	WFI	Wait for interrupt: Enable interrupts (I2 ← 1). Bus activity ceases.
0008	RSVC	Return from supervisor call (B or C): REST (Note: REST: R0 ← (SP)+, R1 ← (SP)+, R2 ← (SP)+, R3 ← (SP)+, R4 ← (SP)+, R5 ← (SP)+), SP ← SP + 2, RTT (Note: RTT: PC ← (SP)+, PS ← (SP)+)
0009	RRTT	Restore and return from trap: REST, RTT
000A	SAVE	Save registers: -(SP) ← R5, -(SP) ← R4, -(SP) ← R3, -(SP) ← R2, -(SP) ← R1, -(SP) ← R0
000B	SAVS	Save status: SAVE (Note: SAVE: -(SP) ← R5, -(SP) ← R4, -(SP) ← R3, -(SP) ← R2, -(SP) ← R1, -(SP) ← R0), -(SP) ← (002E), (002E) ← (002E) ∨ Mask, MSKO, IEN. Note Mask is stored in the second word of instruction.
000C	REST	Restore registers: R0 ← (SP)+, R1 ← (SP)+, R2 ← (SP)+, R3 ← (SP)+, R4 ← (SP)+, R5 ← (SP)+
000D	RRTN	Restore and return: REST, PC ← (SP)+
000E	RSTS	Restore status: (002E) ← (SP)+, MSKO, REST, RTT
000F	RTT	Return from trap: PC ← (SP)+, PS ← (SP)+

=== Supervisor calls ===
These instructions are used to implement operating system (supervisor) calls. All have a six bit register argument. SVCB and SVCC are designed so an argument to the operating system can use most of the addressing modes supported by the native instruction set.

15	6	5	0
Opcode		Arg

Opcode	Mnemonic	Operation
0040	SVCA	Supervisor Call A: -(SP) ← PS ,-(SP) ← PC, PC ← (0022) + Arg × 2, PC ← (PC)
0080	SVCB	Supervisor Call B: TMPA ← SP, -(SP) ← PS, -(SP) ← PC, TMPB ← SP, -(SP) ← TMPA, SAVE (Note: SAVE: -(SP) ← R5, -(SP) ← R4, -(SP) ← R3, -(SP) ← R2, -(SP) ← R1, -(SP) ← R0), R1 ← TMPB, R5 ← Arg × 2, PC ← (0024)
00C0	SVCC	Supervisor Call C: TMPA ← SP, -(SP) ← PS, -(SP) ← PC, TMPB ← SP, -(SP) ← TMPA, SAVE, R1 ← TMPB, R5 ← Arg × 2, PC ← (0026)

=== Condition-code operations ===
15	4	3	2	1	0
Opcode		N	Z	V	C

Opcode	Mnemonic	Operation
0030	LCC	Load condition codes: Load according to N, Z, V, C bits

The four condition codes in the processor status word (PSW) are

- N indicating a negative value
- Z indicating a zero (equal) condition
- V indicating an overflow condition, and
- C indicating a carry condition.

== Interrupts ==
WD16 has three types of interrupts: non-vectored, vectored, and halt. Non-vectored and vectored interrupts are enabled and disabled by the IEN and IDS instructions. Halt cannot be disabled.

A non-vectored interrupt (NVI) has priority over vectored interrupts. The NVI is used for only two things: power fail and line clock. (A line clock is typically a 50 or 60 Hz input used for time slicing and time keeping.) When a NVI is received, PS and PC are pushed. Power fail status is checked. If it is a power fail, the WD16 will jump to the address stored at 0014. If not a power fail, then a line clock tick is assumed and the WD16 will jump to the address stored at 002A.

Sixteen interrupt vectors are supported. When a vectored interrupt is received, PS and PC are pushed. During interrupt acknowledge, the WD16 accepts a four-bit interrupt number provided by the interrupting device. The interrupt vector table address is fetched from 0028 and the interrupt number is added to it, pointing to one of 16 words in the table. A word offset is fetched from the table and added to its own table address. The result is loaded into PC causing a jump to the interrupt service routine. What simultaneous interrupts are taken is determined by a 16-bit interrupt priority mask that is mostly implemented with external hardware. The WD16 stores the current priority mask at 002E while transmitting the mask directly to hardware. The mask is manipulated with the MSKO, SAVS, and RSTS instructions. If more than 16 vectored interrupts are required, they can be initiated through the non-vectored interrupt and dispatched with the IAK instruction.

Halt is a non-maskable interrupt that can be used for a programmer's switch or other uses depending on how its jumpers are configured. Although halt can alter the execution address and is not masked by interrupt enable, it cannot be used as a non-maskable interrupt because PC is not pushed. Depending on jumpers, the halt line may not even halt. If the HALT instruction is executed, it may be cleared by the halt line, again, depending on jumpers.

== Reserved low-memory locations ==
Memory locations between 0000 and 003F have fixed functions defined by the processor. All addresses below are word addresses.

Vector	Condition
0000-0010	R0 - R5, SP, PC, and PS for power up/halt options
0012	bus error PC
0014	nonvectored interrupt power fail PC
0016	power up/halt option power restore PC
0018	parity error PC
001A	reserved op code PC
001C	illegal op code format PC
001E	XCT error PC
0020	XCT trace PC
0022	SVCA table address
0024	SVCB PC
0026	SVCC PC
0028	vectored interrupt (I0) table address
002A	nonvectored interrupt (I1) PC
002C	BPT PC
002E	I/O priority interrupt mask
0030-003C	Floating point scratchpad
003E	Floating point error PC

== Performance ==
WD16 processor speed varies by clock speed, memory configuration, op code, and addressing modes. Instruction timing has up to three components, fetch/execute of the instruction itself and access time for the source and the destination. The last two components depend on the addressing mode. For example, at 3.3 MHz, an instruction of the form ADD x(Rm),y(Rn) has a fetch/execute time of 3.3 microseconds plus source time of 2.7 microseconds and destination time of 3.0 microseconds, for a total instruction time of 9.0 microseconds. The register-to-register ADD Rm,Rn executes in 3.3 microseconds. Floating point is significantly slower. A single-and-a-half precision (48 bit) floating add instruction typically ranges from 54 to 126 microseconds. The WD16's precision is a compromise between traditional single and double precision floats.

For contrast, the fastest PDP-11 computer at the time was the PDP-11/70. An instruction of the form ADD x(Rm),y(Rn) has a fetch/execute time of 1.35 microseconds plus source and destination times of 0.6 microseconds each, for a total instruction time of 2.55 microseconds. Any case where addressed memory is not in the cache adds 1.02 microseconds. The register-to-register ADD Rm,Rn could execute from the cache in 0.3 microseconds. A single-precision floating add instruction executed by the FP11-C co-processor could range from 0.9 to 2.5 microseconds plus time to fetch the operands which could range up to 4.2 microseconds.

The WD16 block transfer instructions approximately double the speed of moves and block I/O. A word moved with MOV (R1)+,(R2)+, SOB R0,loop instructions takes 9.6 microseconds per iteration. The MBWU R1,R2 equivalent takes 4.8 microseconds per iteration.

The Association of Computer Users performed a series of benchmarks on an WD16-based Alpha Microsystems AM-100T costing $35,680 (equivalent to $139,420 in 2025). They found that their CPU-bound benchmark executed in 31.4 seconds on the AM-100T compared to 218 seconds for the average single user system in the $15,000 to $25,000 price range. In a group of multi-user computers priced between $25,000 and $50,000, the AM-100T was in the "upper third" for speed.

The Creative Computing Benchmark of May 1984 placed the WD16 (in the AM-100T application) as number 34 out of 183 machines tested. The elapsed time was 10 seconds, compared to 24 seconds for the IBM PC.

== Emulator ==
Virtual Alpha Micro is an open source WD16 emulator. Written in C, it emulates the WD16 processor and the Alpha Micro AM-100 hardware environment. The author claims it runs on Linux (including Raspberry Pi), Windows, and Macintosh desktops, though no binaries are provided. It will run the Alpha Micro Operating System (AMOS) and all associated programs. In 2002, Alpha Micro granted limited permission to distribute AMOS 4.x or 5.0 binaries including the manuals for hobby use only.

== See also ==
- PDP-11 architecture
- Comparison of instruction set architectures
