= Promiscuous traffic =

In computer networking, promiscuous traffic, or cross-talking, describes situations where a receiver configured to receive a particular data stream receives that data stream and others.

In particular, in multicast socket networking, an example of promiscuous traffic is when a socket configured to listen on a specific multicast address group A with a specific port P, noted A:P, receives traffic from A:P but also from another multicast source. For instance, a socket is configured to receive traffic from the multicast group address 203.0.113.70, port 36000 (noted 203.0.113.70:36000), but receives traffic from both 203.0.113.70:36000 and 203.0.113.71:36000.

This type of promiscuous traffic, due to a lack of address filtering, has been a recurring issue with certain Unix and Linux kernels, but has never been reported on Microsoft Windows operating systems post Windows XP.

Another form of promiscuous traffic occurs when two different applications happen to listen on the same group address. As the former type of promiscuous traffic (lack of address filtering) can be considered a bug at the operating system level, the latter reflects global configuration issues.
