= Group (database) =

Group is a name service database used to store group information on Unix-like operating systems. The sources for the group database (and hence the sources for groups on a system) are configured, like other name service databases, in nsswitch.conf. The database file is located at /etc/group. It contains fields representing the group name, group id, encrypted password, and users belonging to the group. These fields are stored in a structure defined in the header file <grp.h>.

== Seeing available groups on a Unix system ==
The contents of the group database (and available groups) can be seen with a variety of tools:

=== C ===
The <grp.h> header file contains the functions getgrgid and getgrname to look up a group by its ID or Name, as well as the functions setgrent, getgrent, and endgrent to iterate through all groups.

=== Command line ===
The getent command can be used to fetch group information.

==== Fetching a list of all available groups ====
getent group

==== Fetching a specific group ====
For a specific group called 'users':

getent group users

=== Python ===
- grp - The Group Database — a Python module
