= Transport Layer Interface =

In computer networking, the Transport Layer Interface (TLI) was the networking API provided by AT&T UNIX System V Release 3 (SVR3) in 1987 and continued into Release 4 (SVR4). TLI was the System V counterpart to the BSD sockets programming interface, which was also provided in UNIX System V Release 4 (SVR4). TLI was later standardized as XTI, the X/Open Transport Interface.

== TLI and Sockets ==
It was originally expected that the OSI protocols would supersede TCP/IP, thus TLI is designed from an OSI model-oriented viewpoint, corresponding to the OSI transport layer. Otherwise, TLI looks similar, API-wise, to sockets.

TLI and XTI were widely used (?) and, up to UNIX 98, may have been preferred over the POSIX Sockets API with respect to existing standards. However, it was clear at least since the early 1990s that the Berkeley Socket interface would ultimately prevail. TLI and XTI are still supported in SVR4-derived operating systems and operating systems conforming to branded UNIX (UNIX 95, UNIX 98 and UNIX 03 Single UNIX Specifications) such as Solaris and AIX (as well as the classic Mac OS, in the form of Open Transport). Under UNIX 95 (XPG4) and UNIX 98 (XPG5.2), XTI was the preferred and recommended supported API for new transport protocols. As a result of deliberations by the Austin Group with the goal of bringing flavors of UNIX that do not provide STREAMS, such as BSD and Linux, under the Single UNIX Specification, the UNIX 03 Single UNIX Specification both declares STREAMS as optional, and declares POSIX Sockets as the preferred API for new transport protocols.

== See also ==
- X/Open Transport Interface, formally standardized successor to TLI.
- X/Open Portability Guide, the predecessor to POSIX
- Computer networking, outlining the major networking protocols
