= Alpha Microsystems =

Former American computer company

Alpha Microsystems, Inc.
- Industry: Computer hardware and software
- Founded: 1977; 49 years ago in Costa Mesa, California
- Headquarters: Santa Ana, California, United States
- Key people: John French, Dick Wilcox, Bob Hitchcock
- Products: AlphaBASIC, AlphaFortran, AlphaLisp, AlphaPascal

Alpha Microsystems, Inc., often shortened to Alpha Micro, was an American computer company founded in 1977 in Costa Mesa, California, by John French, Dick Wilcox and Bob Hitchcock. During the dot-com boom, the company changed its name to AlphaServ, then NQL Inc., reflecting its pivot toward being a provider of Internet software. However, the company soon reverted to its original Alpha Microsystems name after the dot-com bubble burst.

== Products ==
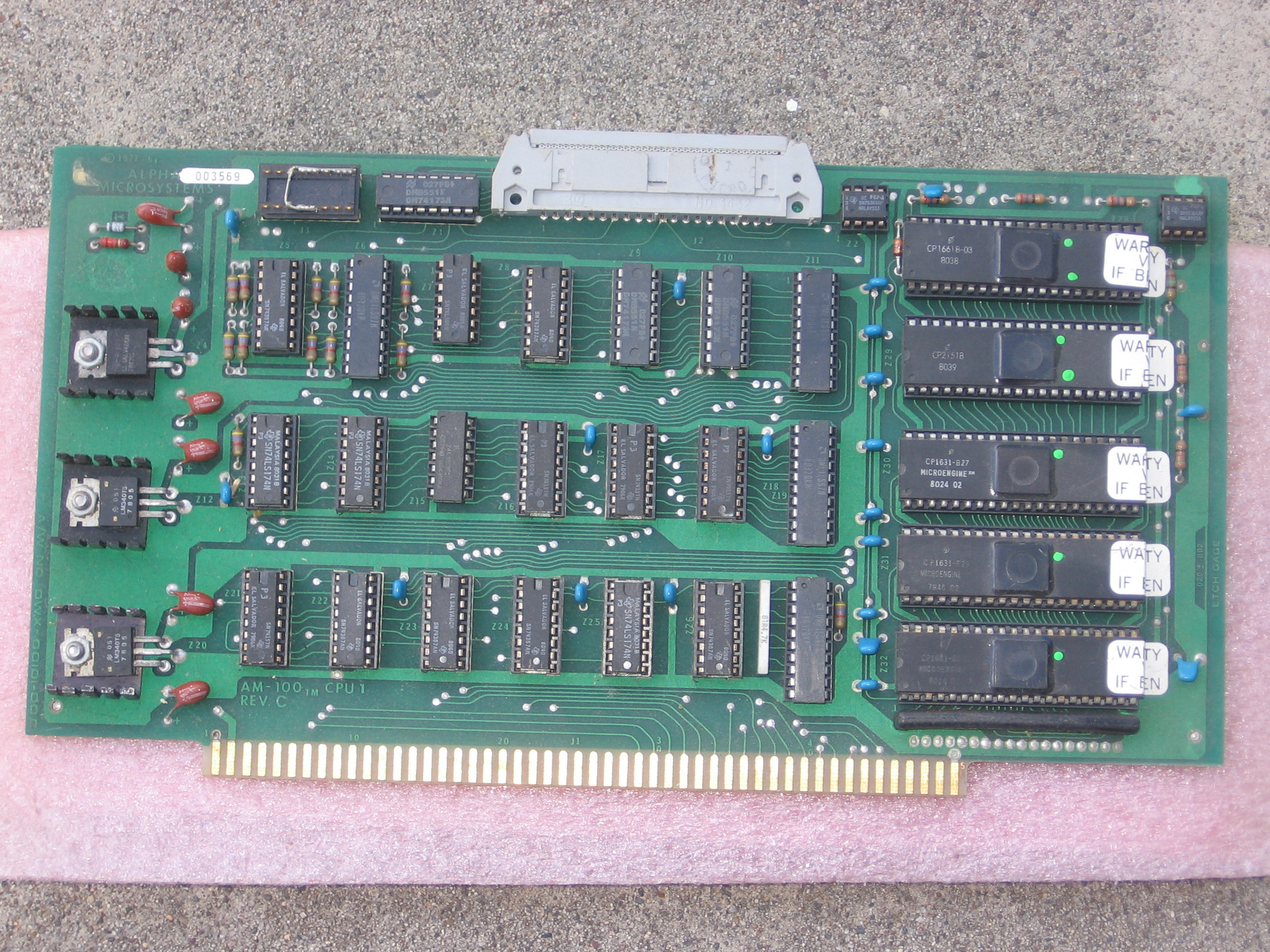
Alpha Microsystems' first product, the AM-100 CPU board

The first Alpha Micro computer was the S-100 AM-100, based upon the WD16 microprocessor chipset from Western Digital. In April 1978, the two-board AM-100 was offered at $1,495 (equivalent to $7,380 in 2025).

As of 1982, AM-100/L and the AM-1000 were based on the Motorola 68000 and succeeding processors, though Alpha Micro swapped several addressing lines to create byte-ordering compatibility with its earlier processor.

Early peripherals included standard computer terminals (such models as Soroc, Hazeltine 1500, and Wyse WY50), Fortran punch card readers, 300 baud rate acoustic coupler modems (later upgraded to 1,200 baud modems), and 10 MB CDC Hawk hard drives with removable disk packs.

The company's primary claim to fame was selling inexpensive minicomputers that provided multi-user power using a proprietary operating system called AMOS (Alpha Micro Operating System). The operating system on the 68000 machines was called AMOS/L. The operating system had major similarities to the operating system of the DEC DECsystem-10. This may not be coincidental; legend has it that the founders based their operating system on "borrowed" source code from DEC, and DEC, perceiving the same, unsuccessfully tried to sue Alpha Micro over the similarities in 1984.

As Motorola stopped developing its 68000 product, Alpha Micro started to move to the x86 CPU family, used in common PCs. This was initially done with the Falcon cards, allowing standard DOS and later Windows-based PCs to run AMOS applications on the 68000-series CPU on the Falcon card. The work done on AMPC became the foundation for AMOS 8.x, which runs natively on x86, but includes a 68K emulator to run older software in a method similar to Apple Inc.'s Mac 68k emulator for PowerPC.

For application development, AMOS used a proprietary BASIC-like language called AlphaBASIC (though several other languages, including Assembler, FORTRAN, Pascal, and COBOL, were available). Older versions interpreted a tokenized executable file. Later versions translate the tokenized executable into x86 code for performance.

Other programming languages included AlphaFortran, AlphaLisp and AlphaPascal.

In the past, Alpha Micro bundled its operating system and tools such as BASIC and its ISAM implementation as part of the hardware sale, also providing patches and OS upgrades for free or at minimal cost. Gradually, Alpha Micro has transitioned to charging for its software as hardware becomes more of a commodity item.

The Alpha Microsystems package often included software that allow traditional multi-user systems, like AMOS and others such as Sun, DEC, HP and IBM mainframes to interface with the Microsoft Windows graphical user interface and supported peripherals. This software functioned similar to Citrix or the X Window System.

The Alpha Micro computer never achieved mainstream name recognition, though it was popular in certain vertical markets, particularly medical, law, and dental offices.

There were two organizations which produced periodic newsletters and held annual meetings; AMUS (Alpha Micro Users Society), and IAMDA (International Alpha Micro Dealer's Association). It was typically at these annual meetings that the latest hardware and software products were announced by Alpha Microsystems and third party developers.
