= Privilege revocation =

Privilege revocation can mean:

- In the context of computer security, Privilege revocation (computing)
- In a legal context, Privilege revocation (law)
