= Cliff Wang =

Computer Science researcher

Cliff Wang is a researcher at North Carolina State university. He was named a Fellow of the Institute of Electrical and Electronics Engineers (IEEE) in 2016 for his leadership in trusted computing and communication systems. In 2021, he was elected as a fellow of American Association for the Advancement of Science(AAAS) for his distinguished contributions to the field of science of security, and outstanding leadership in national research and transforming results into high impact cyber defense capabilities.
