= Identity token =

Identity token may refer to:

- Security token
- Windows NT architecture
- Session token
