= DOAS =

DOAS or doas may refer to:

- Death of a Salesman, a 1949 play by Arthur Miller
- Dedicated outdoor air system, a component in an HVAC system
- Differential optical absorption spectroscopy, in remote sensing
- doas, a software program available in Unix and Unix-like operating systems
