= Wheel (computing) =

Type of user account in Unix systems

In Unix operating systems, a wheel is a user account with a wheel bit, a system setting that provides additional special system privileges that empower a user to execute restricted commands that ordinary user accounts cannot access.

== Origins ==
The term wheel was first applied to computer user privilege levels after the introduction of the TENEX operating system, later distributed under the name TOPS-20 in the 1960s and early 1970s. The term was derived from the slang phrase big wheel, referring to a person with great power or influence.

In the 1980s, the term was imported into Unix culture due to the migration of operating system developers and users from TENEX/TOPS-20 to Unix.

== Wheel group ==
Modern Unix systems generally use user groups as a security protocol to control access privileges. The wheel group is a special user group used on some Linux and Unix (mostly BSD) systems, to control access to the su or sudo command, which allows a user to masquerade as another user (usually the super user). Debian and its derivatives create a group called sudo with purpose similar to that of a wheel group.

== Wheel war ==
The phrase wheel war, which originated at Stanford University, is a term used in computer culture, first documented in the 1983 version of The Jargon File. A 'wheel war' was a user conflict in a multi-user (see also: multiseat) computer system, in which students with administrative privileges would attempt to lock each other out of a university's computer system, sometimes causing unintentional harm to other users.

== See also ==
- Committer
- Superuser
