= Doas =

Computer software

doas
- Original author: Ted Unangst
- Developer: OpenBSD Project
- Release: 18 October 2015; 10 years ago
- Stable release: 1.99 / 15 February 2024; 2 years ago
- Written in: C
- Type: Security software
- License: ISC license
- Website: man.openbsd.org/doas
- Repository: cvsweb.openbsd.org/src/usr.bin/doas/

doas (“dedicated openbsd application subexecutor”) is a program to execute commands as another user. The system administrator can configure it to give specified users privileges to execute specified commands. It is free and open-source under the ISC license and available in Unix and Unix-like operating systems.

doas was developed by Ted Unangst for OpenBSD as a simpler and safer sudo replacement. Unangst himself had issues with the default sudo config, which was his motivation to develop doas. doas was released with OpenBSD 5.8 in October 2015 replacing sudo. However, OpenBSD still provides sudo as a package.

== Configuration ==
Definition of privileges should be written in the configuration file, /etc/doas.conf. The syntax used in the configuration file is inspired by the packet filter configuration file.

=== Examples ===
Allow user1 to execute procmap as root without password:

permit nopass user1 as root cmd /usr/sbin/procmap

Allow members of the wheel group to run any command as root:

permit :wheel as root

Simpler version (only works if default user is root, which it is after install):

permit :wheel

To allow members of wheel group to run any command (default as root) and remember that they entered the password:

permit persist :wheel

== Ports and availability ==
Jesse Smith's port of doas is packaged for DragonFlyBSD, FreeBSD, and NetBSD. According to the author, it also works on illumos and macOS.

OpenDoas, a Linux port, is packaged for Debian, Alpine, Arch, CRUX, Fedora, Gentoo, GNU Guix, Hyperbola, Manjaro, Parabola, NixOS, Ubuntu, and Void Linux. Starting with Alpine Linux v3.16 release, OpenDoas became the suggested replacement for sudo, which got its security maintenance time reduced within the distribution.

== See also ==
- sudo
- runas
