= Session (computer networking) =

Temporary context for interactive information interchange

In computer science and networking, a session is a two-way link, a relatively high layer in the OSI stack enabling interactive information exchange between two or more communication devices or ends – be they computers, automated systems, or live active users (see login session). A session is established at a certain point in time, and then 'torn down' - brought to an end - at some later point. A session may involve more than one message in each direction. A session is typically stateful, meaning that at least one of the communicating parties needs to hold current state information to be able to communicate.

An established session is the basic requirement to perform a connection-oriented communication. A session also is the basic step to transmit in connectionless communication modes. However, any unidirectional transmission does not define a session.

Communication Transport may be implemented as part of protocols and services at the application layer, at the session layer or at the transport layer in the OSI model.

- Application layer examples:
  - HTTP sessions, which allow associating information with individual visitors
  - A telnet remote terminal session
- Session layer example:
  - A Session Initiation Protocol (SIP) based Internet phone call
- Transport layer example:
  - A TCP session, which is synonymous to a TCP connection, or an established TCP socket.

In the case of transport protocols that do not implement a formal session layer (e.g., UDP) or where sessions at the protocol level are too short-lived, sessions are maintained by a higher level program. For example, a HTTP exchange between a browser and a remote host that includes a HTTP cookie with a unique session ID may identify a state such as information about the user's preferences or authorization level.

Maintaining session continuity between HTTP requests requires a session ID. The session ID is embedded within the <A HREF> or <FORM> links of dynamic web pages so that it is passed back to the CGI. CGI then uses the session ID to ensure session continuity between transaction phases.

== Session affinity ==
When a client may connect to any server in a cluster of servers, a special problem is encountered in maintaining consistency when the servers must maintain session state. The client must either be directed to the same server for the duration of the session, or the servers must transmit server-side session information via a shared file system or database. Otherwise, the client may reconnect to a different server than the one it started the session with, which will cause problems when the new server does not have access to the stored state of the old one.

A method of using server-side sessions without persistent storage is to utilize RAM for storage of session data.

== Client-side web sessions ==
Client-side sessions use cookies and encryption to preserve state on the client without storing data on the server. When presenting a dynamic web page, the server sends the current state data to the client (web browser) in the form of a cookie. The client saves the cookie in memory or on disk. With each successive request, the client sends the cookie back to the server, and the server uses the data to "recall" the state of the application for that specific client and generate an appropriate response.

To accomplish this securely, the server needs to encrypt the session data before sending it to the client, and modification of such information by any other party should be prevented via cryptographic means.

Transmitting state back and forth with every request is only practical when the size of the stored information is small.

== HTTP session token ==
A session token is a unique identifier that is generated and sent from a server to a client to identify the current interaction session. The client usually stores and sends the token as an HTTP cookie and/or sends it as a parameter in GET or POST queries. The reason to use session tokens is that the client only has to handle the identifier—all session data is stored on the server (usually in a database, to which the client does not have direct access) linked to that identifier. Examples of the names that some programming languages use when naming their HTTP cookie include JSESSIONID (JSP), PHPSESSID (PHP), CGISESSID (CGI), and ASPSESSIONID (ASP).

== Session management ==
In human–computer interaction, session management is the process of keeping track of a user's activity across sessions of interaction with the computer system.

Typical session management tasks in a desktop environment include keeping track of which applications are open and which documents each application has opened, so that the same state can be restored when the user logs out and logs in later. For a website, session management might involve requiring the user to re-login if the session has expired (i.e., a certain time limit has passed without user activity). It is also used to store information on the server-side between HTTP requests.

=== Desktop session management ===
A desktop session manager is a program that can save and restore desktop sessions. A desktop session is all the windows currently running and their current content. Session management on Linux-based systems is provided by X session manager. On Microsoft Windows systems, session management is provided by the Session Manager Subsystem (smss.exe); user session functionality can be extended by third-party applications like twinsplay.

=== Browser session management ===
Session management is particularly useful in a web browser where a user can save all open pages and settings and restore them at a later date or on a different computer (see data portability).

To help recover from a system or application crash, pages and settings can also be restored on next run. Google Chrome, Mozilla Firefox, Internet Explorer, OmniWeb and Opera are examples of web browsers that support session management. Session management is often managed through the application of cookies.

=== Web server session management ===
Hypertext Transfer Protocol (HTTP) is stateless. Session management is the technique used by the web developer to make the stateless HTTP protocol support session state. For example, once a user has been authenticated to the web server, the user's next HTTP request (GET or POST) should not cause the web server to ask for the user's account and password again. For a discussion of the methods used to accomplish this see HTTP cookie and Session ID

In situations where multiple web servers must share knowledge of session state (as is typical in a cluster environment) session information must be shared between the cluster nodes that are running web server software. Methods for sharing session state between nodes in a cluster include: multicasting session information to member nodes (see JGroups for one example of this technique), sharing session information with a partner node using distributed shared memory or memory virtualization, sharing session information between nodes using network sockets, storing session information on a shared file system such as a distributed file system or a global file system, or storing the session information outside the cluster in a database.

If session information is considered transient, volatile data that is not required for non-repudiation of transactions and does not contain data that is subject to compliance auditing (in the U.S. for example, see the Health Insurance Portability and Accountability Act and the Sarbanes–Oxley Act for examples of two laws that necessitate compliance auditing) then any method of storing session information can be used. However, if session information is subject to audit compliance, consideration should be given to the method used for session storage, replication, and clustering.

In a service-oriented architecture, Simple Object Access Protocol or SOAP messages constructed with Extensible Markup Language (XML) messages can be used by consumer applications to cause web servers to create sessions.

=== Session management over SMS ===
Just as HTTP is a stateless protocol, so is SMS. As SMS became interoperable across rival networks in 1999, and text messaging started its ascent towards becoming a ubiquitous global form of communication, various enterprises became interested in using the SMS channel for commercial purposes. Initial services did not require session management since they were only one-way communications (for example, in 2000, the first mobile news service was delivered via SMS in Finland). Today, these applications are referred to as application-to-peer (A2P) messaging as distinct from peer-to-peer (P2P) messaging. The development of interactive enterprise applications required session management, but because SMS is a stateless protocol as defined by the GSM standards, early implementations were controlled client-side by having the end-users enter commands and service identifiers manually.

== See also ==
- HTTPS
- REST
- Session ID
- Sessionization
- Session fixation
- Session poisoning
