= Session poisoning =

Session poisoning (also referred to as "session data pollution" and "session modification") is a method to exploit insufficient input validation within a server application. Typically a server application that is vulnerable to this type of exploit will copy user input into session variables.

The underlying vulnerability is a state management problem: shared state, race condition, ambiguity in use or plain unprotected modifications of state values.

Session poisoning has been demonstrated in server environments where different, non-malicious applications (scripts) share the same session states but where usage differs, causing ambiguity and race conditions.

Session poisoning has been demonstrated in scenarios where the attacker can introduce malicious scripts into the server environment, which is possible if the attacker and victim share a web host.

== Origins ==
Session poisoning was first discussed as a (potentially new) vulnerability class in the Full disclosure mailing list. Alla Bezroutchko inquired if "Session data pollution vulnerabilities in web applications" was a new problem in January 2006. However, this was an old vulnerability previously noted by others: "this is a classic state management issue" - Yvan Boily; "This is not new" - /someone.

Earlier examples of these vulnerabilities can be found in major security resources/archives such as Bugtraq, e.g.

- July 2001, Serious security hole in Mambo Site Server version 3.0.X by Ismael Peinado Palomo of reverseonline.com
- September 2005, PHP Session modification by unknown (from uw-team) and adam_i

Session pollution has also been covered in some articles, such as PHP Session Security, Przemek Sobstel, 2007.

== Attack examples ==
=== Trivial attack scenario ===
An example code vulnerable to this problem is:

Session("Login") = Request("login")
Session("Username") = Request("username")

Which is subject to trivial attacks such as

vulnerable.asp?login=YES&username=Mary

This problem could exist in software where

- User submits username / password to logon.asp
- If password for Mary checks out, logon.asp forwards to vulnerable.asp?login=YES&username=Mary

The problem is that vulnerable.asp is designed on the assumption that the page is only accessed in a non-malicious way. Anyone who realizes how the script is designed, is able to craft an HTTP request which sets the logon user arbitrarily.

=== Exploiting ambiguous or dual use of same session variable ===
Alla Bezroutchko discusses a scenario where $_SESSION['login'] is used for two different purposes.

- In the login scripts, the session variable stores "This user is logged on".
- In the password reset scripts, the session variable stores "this user wants his password reset".

A race condition was demonstrated, in which the reset scripts could be exploited to change the logged on user arbitrarily.

=== Exploiting scripts allowing writes to arbitrary session variables ===
Alla Bezroutchko discusses examples observed in development forums, which allows writing to arbitrary session variables.

The first example is

$var = $_GET["something"]; 
$_SESSION["$var"] = $var2;

(in which $_GET["something"] is probably from a selection box or similar).

Attack becomes

vulnerable.php?something=SESSION_VAR_TO_POISON

==== Session poisoning attacks enabled by php.ini: register_globals = on ====
php.ini: register_globals = on is known to enable security vulnerabilities in several applications. PHP server administrators are recommended to disable this feature.

Note: Real-world examples of session poisoning in enabled by register_globals = on was publicly demonstrated in back in July 2001 article Serious security hole in Mambo Site Server version 3.0.X.

Second example by /someone is

if ($condition1) { 
    $var = 'SOMETHING'; 
}; 
if ($condition2) { 
    $var = 'OTHER'; 
}; 
$_SESSION["$var"] = $var2;

which is vulnerable if:

- It is possible for attacker to cause both conditions to be false.
- php.ini is misconfigured (register_globals = on), which allows $var default value to be controlled by GPC (GET, POST, or COOKIE) input.

Attack becomes

vulnerable.php?var=SESSION_VAR_TO_POISON

=== Exploit utilizing a shared PHP server (e.g. shared web hosting) ===
'unknown' of uw-team.org discusses a scenario where attacker and victim shares the same PHP server.

Attack is fairly easy:

- The attacker first visits the victim's page, and e.g. log on.
- Attacker then uploads a PHP script to his account, and has it display context of $_SESSION (set by victim script).
- Attacker determines which variable needs to be changed, uploads a script which sets this variable, executes it.
- Attacker visits victim pages to see if anticipated exploit worked.

This attack only requires that victim and attacker share the same PHP server. The attack is not dependent on victim and attacker having the same virtual hostname, as it is trivial for attacker to move the session identifier cookie from one cookie domain to another.

== See also ==
- Session fixation
