= Su (Unix) =

Standard UNIX utility

su
- Original authors: Dennis Ritchie; Ken Thompson
- Developer: AT&T Bell Laboratories
- Initial release: November 3, 1971; 54 years ago
- Operating system: Unix and Unix-like
- Type: Command

The Unix command su, which stands for "substitute user" (or historically "superuser"), is used by a computer user to execute commands with the privileges of another user account. When executed it invokes a shell without changing the current working directory or the user environment.

When the command is used without specifying the new user id as a command line argument, it defaults to using the superuser account (user id 0) of the system.

== History ==
The command su, including the Unix permissions system and the setuid system call, was part of Version 1 Unix. Encrypted passwords appeared in Version 3. The command is available as a separate package for Microsoft Windows as part of the UnxUtils collection of native Win32 ports of common GNU Unix-like utilities.

== Usage ==
When run from the command line, su asks for the target user's password, and if authenticated, grants the operator access to that account and the files and directories that account is permitted to access.

john@localhost:~$ su jane
Password:
jane@localhost:/home/john$ exit
logout
john@localhost:~$

When used with a hyphen (su -) it can be used to start a login shell. In this mode users can assume the user environment of the target user.

john@localhost:~$ su - jane
Password:
jane@localhost:~$

The command sudo is related, and executes a command as another user but observes a set of constraints about which users can execute which commands as which other users (generally in a configuration file named /etc/sudoers, best editable by the command visudo). Unlike su, sudo authenticates users against their own password rather than that of the target user (to allow the delegation of specific commands to specific users on specific hosts without sharing passwords among them and while mitigating the risk of any unattended terminals).

Some Unix-like systems implement the user group wheel, and only allow members to become root with su. This may or may not mitigate these security concerns, since an intruder might first simply break into one of those accounts. GNU su, however, does not support the group wheel for philosophical reasons. Richard Stallman argues that because the group would prevent users from utilizing root passwords leaked to them, the group would allow existing admins to ride roughshod over ordinary users.

== See also ==
- Unix security
- List of Unix commands
- Comparison of privilege authorization features
