= Trusted computing base =

Set of all computer components critical to its security

The trusted computing base (TCB) of a computer system is the set of all hardware, firmware, and/or software components that are critical to its security, in the sense that bugs or vulnerabilities occurring inside the TCB might jeopardize the security properties of the entire system. By contrast, parts of a computer system that lie outside the TCB must not be able to misbehave in a way that would leak any more privileges than are granted to them in accordance to the system's security policy.

The careful design and implementation of a system's trusted computing base is paramount to its overall security. Modern operating systems strive to reduce the size of the TCB so that an exhaustive examination of its code base (by means of manual or computer-assisted software audit or program verification) becomes feasible.

== Definition and characterization ==
The term goes back to John Rushby, who defined it as the combination of operating system kernel and trusted processes. The latter refers to processes which are allowed to violate the system's access-control rules. In the classic paper Authentication in Distributed Systems: Theory and Practice Lampson et al. define the TCB of a computer system as simply

a small amount of software and hardware that security depends on and that we distinguish from a much larger amount that can misbehave without affecting security.

Both definitions, while clear and convenient, are neither theoretically exact nor intended to be, as e.g. a network server process under a UNIX-like operating system might fall victim to a security breach and compromise an important part of the system's security, yet is not part of the operating system's TCB. The Orange Book, another classic computer security literature reference, therefore provides a more formal definition of the TCB of a computer system, as

the totality of protection mechanisms within it, including hardware, firmware, and software, the combination of which is responsible for enforcing a computer security policy.

In other words, trusted computing base (TCB) is a combination of hardware, software, and controls that work together to form a trusted base to enforce your security policy.

The Orange Book further explains that

[t]he ability of a trusted computing base to enforce correctly a unified security policy depends on the correctness of the mechanisms within the trusted computing base, the protection of those mechanisms to ensure their correctness, and the correct input of parameters related to the security policy.

In other words, a given piece of hardware or software is a part of the TCB if and only if it has been designed to be a part of the mechanism that provides its security to the computer system. In operating systems, this typically consists of the kernel (or microkernel) and a select set of system utilities (for example, setuid programs and daemons in UNIX systems). In programming languages designed with built-in security features, such as Java and E, the TCB is formed of the language runtime and standard library.

The term security kernel is used in some computer-security literature for an implementation of the reference monitor concept: the hardware and software mechanisms that mediate access between subjects and objects, must be tamper-resistant, must always be invoked, and must be small enough to be analysed. The Orange Book treats a security kernel as one possible form of the trusted computing base, alongside other ways of implementing the reference validation mechanism.

== Properties ==
=== Predicated upon the security policy ===
As a consequence of the above Orange Book definition, the boundaries of the TCB depend closely upon the specifics of how the security policy is fleshed out. In the network server example above, even though, say, a Web server that serves a multi-user application is not part of the operating system's TCB, it has the responsibility of performing access control so that the users cannot usurp the identity and privileges of each other. In this sense, it definitely is part of the TCB of the larger computer system that comprises the UNIX server, the user's browsers and the Web application; in other words, breaching into the Web server through e.g. a buffer overflow may not be regarded as a compromise of the operating system proper, but it certainly constitutes a damaging exploit on the Web application.

This fundamental relativity of the boundary of the TCB is exemplified by the concept of the 'target of evaluation' ('TOE') in the Common Criteria security process: in the course of a Common Criteria security evaluation, one of the first decisions that must be made is the boundary of the audit in terms of the list of system components that will come under scrutiny.

=== A prerequisite to security ===
Systems that don't have a trusted computing base as part of their design do not provide security of their own: they are only secure insofar as security is provided to them by external means (e.g. a computer sitting in a locked room without a network connection may be considered secure depending on the policy, regardless of the software it runs). This is because, as David J. Farber et al. put it, [i]n a computer system, the integrity of lower layers is typically treated as axiomatic by higher layers. As far as computer security is concerned, reasoning about the security properties of a computer system requires being able to make sound assumptions about what it can, and more importantly, cannot do; however, barring any reason to believe otherwise, a computer is able to do everything that a general Von Neumann machine can. This obviously includes operations that would be deemed contrary to all but the simplest security policies, such as divulging an email or password that should be kept secret; however, barring special provisions in the architecture of the system, there is no denying that the computer could be programmed to perform these undesirable tasks.

These special provisions that aim at preventing certain kinds of actions from being executed, in essence, constitute the trusted computing base. For this reason, the Orange Book (still a reference on the design of secure operating systems as of 2007) characterizes the various security assurance levels that it defines mainly in terms of the structure and security features of the TCB.

=== Software parts of the TCB need to protect themselves ===
As outlined by the aforementioned Orange Book, software portions of the trusted computing base need to protect themselves against tampering to be of any effect. This is due to the von Neumann architecture implemented by virtually all modern computers: since machine code can be processed as just another kind of data, it can be read and overwritten by any program. This can be prevented by special memory management provisions that subsequently have to be treated as part of the TCB. Specifically, the trusted computing base must at least prevent its own software from being written to.

In many modern CPUs, the protection of the memory that hosts the TCB is achieved by adding in a specialized piece of hardware called the memory management unit (MMU), which is programmable by the operating system to allow and deny a running program's access to specific ranges of the system memory. Of course, the operating system is also able to disallow such programming to the other programs. This technique is called supervisor mode; compared to more crude approaches (such as storing the TCB in ROM, or equivalently, using the Harvard architecture), it has the advantage of allowing security-critical software to be upgraded in the field, although allowing secure upgrades of the trusted computing base poses bootstrap problems of its own.

=== Trusted vs. trustworthy ===
As stated above, trust in the trusted computing base is required to make any progress in ascertaining the security of the computer system. In other words, the trusted computing base is “trusted” first and foremost in the sense that it has to be trusted, and not necessarily that it is trustworthy. Real-world operating systems routinely have security-critical bugs discovered in them, which attests to the practical limits of such trust.

The alternative is formal software verification, which uses mathematical proof techniques to show the absence of bugs. Researchers at NICTA and its spinout Open Kernel Labs have recently performed such a formal verification of seL4, a member of the L4 microkernel family, proving functional correctness of the C implementation of the kernel. This makes seL4 the first operating-system kernel which closes the gap between trust and trustworthiness, assuming the mathematical proof is free from error.

=== TCB size ===
Due to the aforementioned need to apply costly techniques such as formal verification or manual review, the size of the TCB has immediate consequences on the economics of the TCB assurance process, and the trustworthiness of the resulting product (in terms of the mathematical expectation of the number of bugs not found during the verification or review). In order to reduce costs and security risks, the TCB should therefore be kept as small as possible. This is a key argument in the debate preferring microkernels to monolithic kernels.

== Examples ==
AIX materializes the trusted computing base as an optional component in its install-time package management system.

== See also ==
- Black box
- Orange Book
- Trust anchor
- Hardware security
