= Privilege revocation (law) =

In law the general term privilege revocation is often used when discussing some paper, such as a drivers licence, being voided after a (negative) condition is met by the holder.
