= Session ID =

Piece of data that identifies a network session

In computer science, a session identifier, session ID or session token is a piece of data that is used in network communications (often over HTTPS) to identify a session, a series of related message exchanges. Session identifiers become necessary in cases where the communications infrastructure uses a stateless protocol such as HTTP. For example, a buyer who visits a seller's website wants to collect a number of articles in a virtual shopping cart and then finalize the shopping by going to the site's checkout page. This typically involves an ongoing communication where several webpages are requested by the client and sent back to them by the server. In such a situation, it is vital to keep track of the current state of the shopper's cart, and a session ID is one way to achieve that goal.

A session ID is typically granted to a visitor on their first visit to a site. It is different from a user ID in that sessions are typically short-lived (they expire after a preset time of inactivity which may be minutes or hours) and may become invalid after a certain goal has been met (for example, once the buyer has finalized their order, they cannot use the same session ID to add more items).

As session IDs are often used to identify a user that has logged into a website, they can be used by an attacker to hijack the session and obtain potential privileges. A session ID is usually a randomly generated string to decrease the probability of obtaining a valid one by means of a brute-force search. Many servers perform additional verification of the client, in case the attacker has obtained the session ID. Locking a session ID to the client's IP address is a simple and effective measure as long as the attacker cannot connect to the server from the same address, but can conversely cause problems for a client if the client has multiple routes to the server (e.g. redundant internet connections) and the client's IP address undergoes Network Address Translation.

Examples of the names that some programming languages use when naming their cookie include JSESSIONID (Java EE), PHPSESSID (PHP), and ASPSESSIONID (Microsoft ASP).

== See also ==
- Session management
