= Toru Ishida =

Japanese computer scientist

- Born: July 17, 1953 (age 73)
- Education: Kyoto University
- Known for: Language Grid, Multi-agent system, digital cities, intercultural collaboration
- Awards: IEICE Distinguished Achievement and Contributions Award, IEICE Achievement Award, JSAI Achievement Award, IFAAMAS Influential Paper Award
- Scientific career
- Fields: Computer Science
- Workplaces: Kyoto University, Waseda University, Nippon Telegraph and Telephone
- Website: https://oldtextbook.com/toru.ishida

Toru Ishida (石田 亨, Ishida Tōru; born July 17, 1953) is a Japanese computer scientist specializing in multi-agent systems. He has been working on action research projects including Digital City Kyoto, Intercultural Collaboration Experiments, and the Language Grid. He is a professor emeritus of Kyoto University.

== Biography ==
Toru Ishida graduated from the Department of Information Science, Faculty of Engineering, Kyoto University in 1976, and received master's and PhD degrees from the Graduate School of Engineering, Kyoto University in 1978 and 1989. He became a senior research engineer with NTT Information Communication Processing Laboratories in 1989, and with NTT Communication Science Laboratories in 1991. After moving to Kyoto University, he became a professor in the Department of Information Science, Graduate School of Engineering. From 1998 to 2019, he served as a professor in the Department of Social Informatics, Graduate School of Informatics, Kyoto University. From 2019 to 2022, he served as a professor of the Faculty of Science and Engineering at Waseda University. He has also served as a visiting scientist/professor at Columbia University, Technische Universitaet Muenchen, Le Laboratoire d'Informatique de Paris 6, University of Maryland, Shanghai Jiao Tong University, Tsinghua University, Xinjiang University, Hong Kong Baptist University and Telkom University.

He was elected as Fellow of the Institute of Electrical and Electronics Engineers (IEEE) in 2002, Information Processing Society of Japan (IPSJ) in 2004, and Institute of Electronics, Information and Communication Engineers (IEICE) in 2008. He became an honorary member of the IEICE in 2018. His services for IEICE include Chair of the Information and Systems Society (IEICE-ISS) from 2011 to 2013, Vice President from 2014 to 2016, President Elect from 2020 to 2021, and President from 2021 to 2022. He was a research supervisor at Japan Science and Technology Agency (JST) PRESTO Information Environments and Humans, and a member of the Science Council of Japan from 2011 to 2017.

== Work ==
Toru Ishida has been working on Autonomous agents and Multi-agent systems since 1988. He worked toward creation of the International Conference on Autonomous Agents and Multiagent Systems (AAMAS). He served as a General Co-Chair of the first AAMAS. He was a board member of the International Foundation on Autonomous Agent and Multiagent Systems (IFAAMAS).

He has led several research projects, such as Digital City Kyoto, Intercultural Collaboration Experiments and the Language Grid. The Digital City Kyoto project aimed at integrating a city's physical space and information activity. This project established a community forum that involved more than 100 people from the industry, academics, government, and local citizens. He initiated the Intercultural Collaboration Experiment (ICE) with Chinese, Korean, and Malaysian colleagues in 2002, a year after 9.11. The concept "intercultural collaboration" was coined during this experiment. In 2006, the Language Grid project was launched to create a multilingual service platform on the Internet to support various intercultural collaboration activities. The Language Grid was initially operated by the Department of Social Informatics, Kyoto University (2007-2017), followed by the NPO Language Grid Association since 2018. Until November 2018, 183 groups from 24 countries joined the Language Grid to share more than 220 language services.

He created a Design School at Kyoto University with his colleagues in Informatics, Architecture, Mechanical Engineering, Management, and Psychology. The school became operational in April 2013.

== Honors and awards ==
- 2018: IEICE Honorary Member
- 2017: IEICE Distinguished Achievement and Contributions Award
- 2014: Hong Kong Baptist University Distinguished Professor of Science
- 2013: IEICE Achievement Award
- 2012: JSAI Achievement Award
- 2010: IFAAMAS Influential Paper Award
