= Service composability principle =

Computing design principle

In computing, service composability is a design principle, applied within the service-orientation design paradigm, that encourages the design of services that can be reused in multiple solutions that are themselves made up of composed services. The ability to recompose the service is ideally independent of the size and complexity of the service composition.

This principle is directly responsible for the agility promised by service-oriented architecture (SOA) as it promotes composing new solutions by reusing existing services.

== Purpose ==
The concept of developing software out of independently existing components encourages the concept of composition. This is the underlying concept within object-orientation where the end product is composed of several interlinked objects that have the ability to become part of multiple software solutions, no matter how complex the solution is. The same composition concept is inherited by service-orientation, whereby a business process is automated by combining multiple services. However, within service-orientation there is even greater focus on building services that can be composed and recomposed within multiple solutions to provide the agility promised by the SOA. As a result of this emphasis, some guidelines are required to develop services that can be effectively aggregated into multiple solutions.

The service composability principle provides design considerations that help towards designing composable services with a view to encourage service reuse as much as possible. The guidelines provided by this principle prepare the service so that it is ready to participate in service compositions without requiring any further design changes.

== Application ==
The application of the service composability principle requires designing services so that they can be used in a service composition either as a service that controls other services, i.e. a controller service, or as a service that provides functionality to other services in the composition without further composing other services, i.e. a composition member.

For the service to provide this dual functionality, the service contract must be designed so that it presents functionality based on varying levels of input and output data. In case if it is required to participate as a composition member, then usually the input parameters to the service would be more fine grained as compared to the situation when it is required to participate as a composition controller. A heavily reused service must be as stateless as possible (service statelessness principle) so that it can provide optimum performance when composed within multiple service compositions.
The effectiveness of this principle depends upon the extent to which rest of the design principles have been applied successfully. The application of the standardized service contract principle makes the services interoperable with others, and helps to keep the composition design simpler by avoiding the need to perform runtime data model transformation. By applying the service loose coupling principle, a service could be recomposed with the confidence that it would not create any form of negative coupling with the other service in the composition. The application of the service autonomy and the service statelessness principles increase the reliability and availability of the service so that it be reused in multiple service compositions with increased confidence.

== Considerations ==
For the service to be an efficient service controller as well as a service member, the underlying technology architecture needs to provide a runtime environment that is scalable and can support the statelessness required by the service. Similarly as the service compositions increase in size, the storage and retrieval of the context data, related to the runtime interaction of the services, may need to be delegated to the runtime environment instead of the services managing this context data to make the service composition more efficient.

As more and more service compositions are built, there is a tendency of getting dependent on a service that is highly reused. This requires careful analysis during the design of the service compositions and considering alternate standby services for critical functionality. On the other hand, it may become difficult to evolve a service that is now become a part of multiple service compositions. This could be addressed by the application of the Concurrent Contracts design pattern that advocates maintaining multiple concurrent contracts for a service. This way the service can evolve while providing backward compatibility.

Some of the factors that determine the composability potential of a service include:

- Ability to provide functionality at different levels within a business process.
- Message Exchange pattern
- Whether the service supports transactions and rollback/compensation features.
- Support for exception handling.
- The availability of meta-data about service capabilities and behavior.

== See also ==
- Executable choreography
- Service choreography
