= Canonical =

Standard or referential form

The adjective canonical is applied in many contexts to mean 'according to the canon' – the standard, rule or primary source that is accepted as authoritative for the body of knowledge or literature in that context. In mathematics, canonical example is often used to mean 'archetype'.

== Science and technology ==
- Canonical form, a natural unique representation of an object, or a preferred notation for some object

=== Mathematics ===
- Canonical basis – Basis of a type of algebraic structure
- Canonical coordinates, sets of coordinates that can be used to describe a physical system at any given point in time
- Canonical map, a morphism that is uniquely defined by its main property
- Canonical polyhedron, a polyhedron whose edges are all tangent to a common sphere, whose center is the average of its vertices
- Canonical ring, a graded ring associated to an algebraic variety
- Canonical injection, in set theory
- Canonical representative, in set theory a standard member of each element of a set partition

==== Differential geometry ====
- Canonical one-form, a special 1-form defined on the cotangent bundle T*M of a manifold M
- Canonical symplectic form, the exterior derivative of this form
- Canonical vector field, the corresponding special vector field defined on the tangent bundle TM of a manifold M

=== Physics ===
- Canonical ensemble, in statistical mechanics, is a statistical ensemble representing a probability distribution of microscopic states of the system
- Canonical quantum gravity, an attempt to quantize the canonical formulation of general relativity
- Canonical stress–energy tensor, a conserved current associated with translations through space and time
- Canonical theory, a unified molecular theory of physics, chemistry, and biology
- Canonical conjugate variables, pairs of variables mathematically defined in such a way that they become Fourier transform duals
- Canonical transformation, in Hamiltonian mechanics
- Grand canonical ensemble, a probability distribution of microscopic states for an open system, which is being maintained in thermodynamic equilibrium
- Microcanonical ensemble, a theoretical tool used to analyze an isolated thermodynamic system

=== Computing ===
- Canonical Huffman code, a particular type of Huffman code with unique properties which allow it to be described in a very compact manner
- Canonical link element, an HTML element that helps webmasters prevent duplicate content issues by specifying the “canonical” or “preferred” version
- Canonical model, a design pattern used to communicate between different data formats
- Canonical name record (CNAME record), a type of Domain Name System record
- Canonical S-expressions, a binary encoding form of a subset of general S-expression
- Canonical XML, a normal form of XML, intended to allow relatively simple comparison of pairs of XML documents
- MAC address (formerly canonical number), a unique identifier assigned to network interfaces for communications on the physical network segment
- Canonicalization, a process for converting data to canonical form

=== Chemistry ===
- Canonical form, any of a set of representations of the resonance structure of a molecule each of which contributes to the real structure

== Religion ==
- Canonical coronation, an institutional act of the pope to legally crown images venerated by the faithful through a papal bull
- Canonical hours, the divisions of the day in terms of periods of fixed prayer at regular intervals.
- Canonical law, a set of ordinances and regulations governing a Christian church or community
- Canonical texts or biblical canon, the texts accepted as part of the Bible
  - Canonical gospel, the four gospels accepted as part of the New Testament
  - Canonical criticism, a way of interpreting the Bible that focuses on the text of the biblical canon itself as a finished product

== Businesses ==
- Canonical Ltd., software company that develops the Ubuntu operating system

== See also ==
- Canonical model (disambiguation)
- Text corpus
- Archetype, in behavior, modern psychological theory, and literary analysis
- Official § Adjective
