= Discoverability =

Ease of finding a piece of information

Discoverability is the degree to which something, especially a piece of content or information, can be found in a search of a file, database, or other information system. Discoverability is a concern in library and information science, many aspects of digital media, software and web development, and in marketing, since products and services cannot be used if people cannot find it or do not understand what it can be used for. In human-computer interaction the term is further used to describe the discoverability of interactions, features and interactive systems overall.

Metadata, or "information about information", such as a book's title, a product's description, or a website's keywords, affects how discoverable something is on a database or online. Adding metadata to a product that is available online can make it easier for end users to find the product. For example, if a song file is made available online, making the title, band name, genre, year of release, and other pertinent information available in connection with this song means the file can be retrieved more easily. The organization of information through the implementation of alphabetical structures or the integration of content into search engines exemplifies strategies employed to enhance the discoverability of information.

The concept of discoverability, while related to but distinct from accessibility and usability, which are other qualities that affect the usefulness of a piece of information, is a critical aspect of information retrieval.

== Etymology ==
The concept of "discoverability" in an information science and online context is a loose borrowing from the concept of the similar name in the legal profession. In law, "discovery" is a pre-trial procedure in a lawsuit in which each party, through the law of civil procedure, can obtain evidence from the other party or parties by means of discovery devices such as a request for answers to interrogatories, request for production of documents, request for admissions and depositions. Discovery can be obtained from non-parties using subpoenas. When a discovery request is objected to, the requesting party may seek the assistance of the court by filing a motion to compel to compel discovery.

== Purpose ==
The usability of any piece of information directly relates to how discoverable it is, either in a "walled garden" database or on the open Internet. The quality of information available on this database or on the Internet depends upon the quality of the meta-information about each item, product, or service. In the case of a service, because of the emphasis placed on service reusability, opportunities should exist for reuse of this service. However, reuse is only possible if information is discoverable in the first place. To make items, products, and services discoverable, the process is as follows:

1. Document the information about the item, product or service (the metadata) in a consistent manner.
2. Store the documented information (metadata) in a searchable repository.
  - while technically a human-searchable repository, such as a printed paper list would qualify, "searchable repository" is usually taken to mean a computer-searchable repository, such as a database that a human user can search using some type of search engine or "find" feature.
3. Enable search for the documented information in an efficient manner.
  - supports number 2, because while reading through a printed paper list by hand might be feasible in a theoretical sense, it is not time and cost-efficient in comparison with computer-based searching.

Apart from increasing the reuse potential of the services, discoverability is also required to avoid development of solution logic that is already contained in an existing service. To design services that are not only discoverable but also provide interpretable information about their capabilities, the service discoverability principle provides guidelines that could be applied during the service-oriented analysis phase of the service delivery process.

=== Specific to digital media ===
In relation to audiovisual content, according to the meaning given by the Canadian Radio-television and Telecommunications Commission (CRTC) for the purpose of its 2016 Discoverability Summit, discoverability can be summed up to the intrinsic ability of given content to "stand out of the lot", or to position itself so as to be easily found and discovered. A piece of audiovisual content can be a movie, a TV series, music, a book (eBook), an audio book or podcast. When audiovisual content such as a digital file for a TV show, movie, or song, is made available online, if the content is "tagged" with identifying information such as the names of the key artists (e.g., actors, directors and screenwriters for TV shows and movies. Singers, musicians and record producers for songs) and the genres (for movies genres, music genres, etc.).

When users interact with online content, algorithms typically determine what types of content the user is interested in, and then a computer program suggests "more like this", which is other content that the user may be interested in. Different websites and systems have different algorithms, but one approach, used by Amazon (company) for its online store, is to indicate to a user: "customers who bought x also bought y" (affinity analysis, collaborative filtering). This example is oriented around online purchasing behaviour, but an algorithm could also be programmed to provide suggestions based on other factors (e.g., searching, viewing, etc.).

Discoverability is typically referred to in connection with search engines. A highly "discoverable" piece of content would appear at the top, or near the top of a user's search results. A related concept is the role of "recommendation engines", which give a user recommendations based on his/her previous online activity. Discoverability applies to computers and devices that can access the Internet, including various console video game systems and mobile devices such as tablets and smartphones. When producers make an effort to promote content (e.g., a TV show, film, song, or video game), they can use traditional marketing (billboards, TV ads, radio ads) and digital ads (pop-up ads, pre-roll ads, etc.), or a mix of traditional and digital marketing.

Even before the user's intervention by searching for a certain content or type of content, discoverability is the prime factor which contributes to whether a piece of audiovisual content will be likely to be found in the various digital modes of content consumption. As of 2017, modes of searching include looking on Netflix for movies, Spotify for music, Audible for audio books, etc., although the concept can also more generally be applied to content found on Twitter, Tumblr, Instagram, and other websites. It involves more than a content's mere presence on a given platform; it can involve associating this content with "keywords" (tags), search algorithms, positioning within different categories, metadata, etc. Thus, discoverability enables as much as it promotes. For audiovisual content broadcast or streamed on digital media using the Internet, discoverability includes the underlying concepts of information science and programming architecture, which are at the very foundation of the search for a specific product, information or content.

=== Human-Computer Interaction ===
In human–computer interaction (HCI), discoverability refers to the ability of users to perceive and comprehend a system, function, or input method upon encountering it, despite a lack of prior awareness or knowledge, whether through intentional effort or serendipitously. The concept was popularised by Don Norman, who framed it around whether users can determine what actions are possible and how to perform them. Discoverability is considered a precondition for learnability, though the two concepts are frequently conflated in the literature.

== Applications ==
=== Within a webpage ===
Within a specific webpage or software application ("app"), the discoverability of a feature, content or link depends on a range of factors, including the size, colour, highlighting features, and position within the page. When colour is used to communicate the importance of a feature or link, designers typically use other elements as well, such as shadows or bolding, for individuals, who cannot see certain colours. Just as traditional paper printing created other physical locations that stood out, such as being "above the fold" of a newspaper versus "below the fold", a web page or app's screenview may have certain locations that give features additional visibility to users, such as being right at the bottom of the web page or screen.

The positional advantages or disadvantages of various locations depend on different cultures and languages (e.g., left to right vs. right to left). Some locations have become established, such as having toolbars at the top of a screen or webpage. Some designers have argued that commonly used features (e.g., a print button) should be much more visually prominent than very rarely used features. Some features cannot be seen, but there is a convention that if the user places the mouse cursor in a certain area, then a toolbar or function option will become visible. In general, because of the smaller screen of mobile devices, controls are often not placed right in the centre of the screen, because that is where the user views content or text.

Some organizations try to increase the discoverability of a certain feature by adding animation, such as a moving "click here" icon. As of 2017, the addition of motion sensors and geotracking to mobile devices has made webpage design for discoverability more complex, because smartphones and tablets are typically capable of having many more inputs from the user than a 1980s era desktop, including "swiping" the touchscreen, touching images on the screen, or tilting the device. One of the challenges in webpage and app design is that the degree of sophistication and experience of users with navigating in the webpage or app environment varies a great deal, from individuals who are new to using these applications at one extreme to experienced computer users.

=== Internet search ===
For items that are searched for online, the goal of discoverability is to be at or near the top of the search results. Organizations may make efforts to make it more likely, that "their" content or webpages are at the top, or close to the top, of search results; these approaches are often collectively called search engine optimization (SEO). Note that when an organization takes action to increase the SEO of its website, this does not normally involve changes to the search engine itself; rather, it involves adding metadata tags and original content, among other strategies, to increase the "visibility" of the website to search engine algorithms.

Recent discussions of discoverability have also considered AI-generated answer systems, in which visibility may depend not only on ranking in conventional search results but also on whether sources are selected, cited, and synthesized in generated responses.

==== Services ====
In a service delivery context, the application of this principle requires collecting information about the service during the service analysis phase as during this phase; maximum information is available about the service's functional context and the capabilities of the service. At this stage, the domain knowledge of the business experts could also be enlisted to document meta-data about the service. In the service-oriented design phase, the already gathered meta-data could be made part of the service contract. The OASIS SOA-RM standard specifies service description as an artifact that represents service meta-data.

To make the service meta-data accessible to interested parties, it must be centrally accessible. This could either be done by publishing the service-meta to a dedicated 'service registry' or by simply placing this information in a 'shared directory'. In case of a 'service registry', the repository can also be used to include QoS, SLA and the current state of a service.

=== Voice user interfaces ===
Voice user interfaces may have low discoverability if users are not aware of the commands that they are able to say, so these interfaces may display a list of available commands to help users find them.

== Metadata types ==
=== Functional ===
This is the basic type of meta-information that expresses the functional context of the service and the details about the product, content, or service's capabilities. The application of the standardized service contract principle helps to create the basic functional meta-data in a consistent manner. The same standardization should be applied when the same meta-information is being outside the technical contract of the service e.g. when publishing information to a service registry.

For general items, the data that might be used to categorize them may include:

- Name of product, content or service (for audiovisual content, this would be song name, or TV show/movie title)
- Name of manufacturer, designer, creators (for audiovisual content, this would be names of director/producer/artists)
- Technical data (size, weight, height for physical items, or in the case of digital files, compression approach, file size)
- For items which can identify their location via embedded sensors (such as with Internet of things geolocation data), location of use/access)

=== Quality of service ===
For services, to know about the service behavior and its limitations, and about the user experience, all of this information needs to be documented within the service registry. This way potential consumers can use this meta-information by comparing it against their performance requirements.

== Considerations ==
=== Services ===
The effective application of this design principle requires that the meta-information recorded against each service needs to be consistent and meaningful. This is only possible if organization-wide standards exist that enforce service developers to record the required meta-data in a consistent way. The information recorded as the meta-data for the service needs to be presented in a way so that both technical and non-technical IT experts can understand the purpose and the capabilities of the service, as an evaluation of the service may be required by the business people before the service is authorized to be used.

This principle is best applied during the service-oriented analysis phase as during this time, all the details about the service's purpose and functionality are available. Although most of the service design principles support each other in a positive manner, however, in case of service abstraction and service discoverability principle, there exists an inversely proportional relationship. This is because as more and more details about the service are hidden away from the service consumers, less discoverable information is available for discovering the service. This could be addressed by carefully recording the service meta-information so that the inner workings of the service are not documented within this meta-information.

=== Algorithms ===
In the digital economy, sophisticated algorithms are required for the analysis of the ways that end users search for, access and use different content or products online. Thus, not only is metadata created regarding the content or product, but also data about specific users' interaction with this content. If a social media website has a user profile for a given person, indicating demographic information (age, gender, location of residence, employment status, education, etc.), then this website can collect and analyse information about tendencies and preferences of a given user or a subcategory of users. This raises potential privacy concerns.

Algorithms have been called “black boxes”, because the factors used by the leading websites in their algorithms are typically proprietary information which is not released to the public. While a number of search engine optimization (SEO) firms offer the services of attempting to increase the ranking of a client's web content or website, these SEO firms do not typically know the exact algorithms used by Google and Facebook. Web crawlers can only access 26% of new online content "...by recrawling a constant fraction of the entire web".

One concern raised with the increasing role of algorithms in search engines and databases is the creation of filter bubbles. To give a practical example, if a person searches for comedy movies online, a search engine algorithm may start mainly recommending comedies to this user, and not showing him or her the range of other films (e.g., drama, documentary, etc.). On the positive side, if this person only likes comedy films, then this restricted "filter" will reduce the information load of scanning through vast numbers of films. However, various cultural stakeholders have raised concerns about how these filter algorithms may restrict the diversity of material that is discoverable to users. Concerns about the dangers of "filter bubbles" have been raised in regards to online news services, which provide types of news, news sources, or topics to a user based on his/her previous online activities. Thus a person who has previously searched for Fox TV content will mainly be shown more Fox TV content and a person who has previously searched for PBS content will be shown more PBS search results, and so on. This could lead to news readers becoming only aware of a certain news source's viewpoints.

The search behaviour of video content viewers has changed a great deal with increasing popularity of video sharing websites and video streaming. Whereas a typical TV show consumer of the 1980s would read a print edition of TV Guide to find out what shows were on, or click from channel to channel ("channel surfing") to see if any shows appealed to them, in the 2010s, video content consumers are increasingly watching on screens (either smart TVs, tablet computer screens or smartphones), that have a computerized search function and often automated algorithm-created suggestions for the viewer. With this search function, a user can enter the name of a TV show, producer, actor, screenwriter or genre to help them find content of interest to them. If the user is using a search engine on a smart device, this device may transmit information about the user's preferences and previous online searches to the website. Furthermore, in the 1980s, the type or brand of television a user was watching on did not affect his/her viewing habits. However, a person searching for TV shows in the 2010s on different brands of computerized smart TVs will probably get different search results for the same search term.

=== Limitations ===
For organizations that are trying to get maximal user uptake of their product, discoverability has become an important goal. However, achieving discovery does not automatically translate into market success. For example, if the hypothetical online game "xyz" is easily discoverable, but it will not function on most mobile devices, then this video game will not perform well in the mobile game market, despite it being at the top of search results. As well, even if the product functions, that is it runs or plays properly, as well, users may not like the product.

In the case that a user does like a certain online product or service, the discoverability has to be repeatable. If the user cannot find the product or service on a subsequent search, she or he may no longer look for this product/service, and instead shift to a substitute that is easily and reliably findable. It is not enough to make the online product or service discoverable for only a short period, unless the goal is only to create “viral content" as part of a short-term marketing campaign.

== See also ==
- Findability
- Information foraging
- Service-oriented architecture
- WSDL
