= Service refactoring =

Within the service-orientation design paradigm, Service Refactoring is a design pattern, which is applied to an existing service so that either the service logic or its implementation can be changed without affecting the service consumers.

== Rationale ==
It is natural for a service to undergo changes for various reasons. The change could be required because the underlying implementation e.g. databases, legacy systems, etc. needs to be upgraded or simply because the original service logic was not making efficient use of memory. In other cases, the change could be initiated by the service consumers themselves. For example, with limited concurrent usage, the service performs as stated in its SLA, however, with an increase in its concurrent usage, the service is unable to fulfill its SLA, consequently the service needs to respond to the increasing performance demands from its service consumers.

This situation needs to be addressed in a way that upgrades the service without disrupting consumers who have already become dependent on it. Although one could argue that responding to any of the aforementioned requirements should not be problematic as long as the service honors its contract. However, we are concerned with both the outcome from the execution of service capabilities and also with the behavior and reliability of the service. The Service Refactoring design pattern provides a strategy aimed at ensuring that a service can evolve without negatively affecting its consumers.

== Usage ==
The application of this design pattern advocates the use of traditional software refactoring techniques. The focus is on refactoring the service in smaller steps so that the impact of each step is minimal and can be easily reversed if it negatively affects the service consumers. Secondly, to ensure the service contract remains unaffected by changes in logic or implementation, the service contract must be decoupled as much as possible. This can be done by introducing a façade component between the service contract and the service logic. However, this is only possible if the service contract is physically decoupled from its implementation in the first place, which could be accomplished by the application of the Decoupled Contract design pattern. This could further be strengthened by the application of the Contract Centralization design pattern that advocates establishing the service’s contract as the only official entry point into the service.

On the other hand, to insulate service logic from negative effects from changes in the service implementation, the Service Façade design pattern could be reapplied to introduce another façade component between the service implementation and the service logic. The application of the Service Abstraction principle can further help to reduce the possibilities of any detrimental effects caused by the application of this design pattern.

== Considerations ==
The application of the Service Refactoring design pattern requires extensive testing to ensure a reliable and proven service, although inefficient, carries on the same level of behavioral stability and reliability. This might increase the project costs and would require additional quality assurance procedures and strict governance.

On the other hand, with its application, there might be a change to the current abstraction levels of the service, which would in turn require reapplication of the Service Abstraction design principle to ensure the service maintains the right level of abstraction. In some situations it might be impossible to constrain the effect of changes in the service logic or its implementation, and inadvertently the service contract must be updated. In this case, the Concurrent Contracts design pattern could be applied, allowing the service to continue supporting consumers dependent on the old contract while simultaneously offering an updated contract that aligns with the new service logic or implementation.
