= Kazuya Masu =

Japan engineer

President of Tokyo Institute of Technology, Japan
- Incumbent
- Assumed office 2018

Personal details
- Born: 1952 (age 73–74) Japan
- Education: Tokyo Institute of Technology, Japan
- Profession: University President
- Scientific career
- Education: Tokyo Institute of Technology
- Fields: Electronic engineering
- Workplaces: Tokyo Institute of Technology
- Thesis: (1982)

Kazuya Masu (益 一哉) is the President of Tokyo Institute of Technology, Japan. He is an electronic engineer.

== Early life ==
Masu was educated at Kobe City College of Technology (KCCT) from 1970 to 1975. Then, he join at Tokyo Institute of Technology (Tokyo Tech), receiving his bachelor and master degrees in engineering in 1977 and 1979 respectively. In 1982, he received his Ph.D. in electrical engineering from the same university.

== Career ==
Upon graduation, he joined the Research Institute of Electrical Communication at Tohoku University as an assistant professor. He became an associate professor in 1993. In 2000, he joined Tokyo Institute of Technology (Tokyo Tech) as a professor in the Precision and Intelligence Laboratory. In 2016, he became the director-general of Institute of Innovative Research at Tokyo Tech. In 2018, he was named president of Tokyo Tech.

== Awards ==
Masu was elected a fellow of the Japan Society of Applied Physics in 2009. He was awarded the IEICE achievement medal in 2013.
