= Katherine Isbister =

American researcher and academic

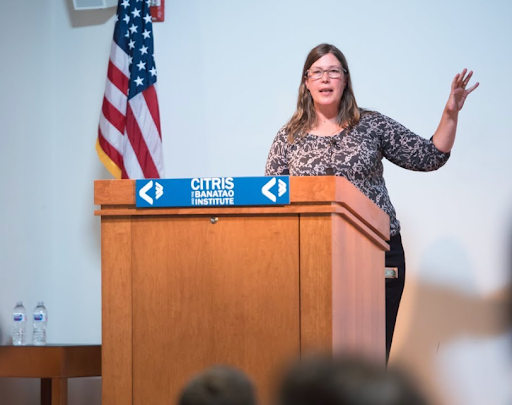
- Isbister presenting at the CITRIS Research Exchange in 2017
- Born: Katherine Currie Isbister; Illinois, US
- Citizenship: American
- Education: University of Chicago (BA); Stanford University (MA, PhD)
- Known for: Games and emotion Social virtual reality Game usability
- Awards: ACM Distinguished Member (2016); Founding Fellow, HEVGA (2016)
- Scientific career
- Fields: Human computer interaction Game design
- Workplaces: University of California Santa Cruz; New York University; IT University of Copenhagen; Rensselaer Polytechnic Institute; Stanford University
- Thesis: Reading personality in onscreen interactive characters (1998)
- Doctoral advisor: Clifford Nass
- Other academic advisors: Byron Reeves, Barbara Hayes-Roth, Larry Friedlander
- Website: katherineinterface.com

Katherine Isbister is an American researcher and designer specializing in human computer interaction (HCI) and game design. She is a professor of computational media at the University of California, Santa Cruz. Previously, she was an associate professor at New York University, with a joint appointment in computer science and in the Game Center at the Tisch School of the Arts. At NYU, she was the founding research director of the Game Innovation Lab.

== Education and early life ==
Isbister was born in Illinois, US, and grew up in North Carolina. She attended the North Carolina School of Science and Mathematics for high school before earning a Bachelor of Arts in English Literature at the University of Chicago. She later obtained a Master of Science (1995) and Ph.D. (1998) from Stanford University in the Communication Department, where she worked with Clifford Nass on human-computer interaction.

== Career ==
After completing her Ph.D., Isbister worked as a postdoctoral researcher at the NTT Open Science Laboratory in Kyoto, Japan, contributing to the Digital Cities project with Toru Ishida. She later joined NetSage, a startup co-founded by her Ph.D. advisor.

In 2004, Isbister became an Associate Professor at Rensselaer Polytechnic Institute before moving to the IT University of Copenhagen in 2008. She later returned to the U.S. to teach at NYU where she held a faculty position in both computer science and the Game Center until 2015. In 2015, she joined UC Santa Cruz as a professor in the Computational Media department. There, she directs the Social Emotional Technology Lab.

== Research and publications ==
Isbister's work focuses on designing emotionally and socially engaging digital experiences. She has contributed to research on character/avatar/agent design, user experience, and playful technology. Her books include:

- Better Game Characters by Design: A Psychological Approach (2006), nominated for a Game Developer Magazine Frontline Award.
- How Games Move Us (MIT Press, 2016).
- Playful Wearables (MIT Press, 2024).
- Game Usability: Advice from the Experts for Advancing the Player Experience (first edition 2008, second edition 2022).

Her recent research has explored playful approaches to emotion regulation and social virtual reality (VR). Her work on VR meeting spaces and scientific sensemaking tools has received funding from the Sloan Foundation and the National Science Foundation. Her research on emotion regulation led to the development of Purrble, a self-soothing toy named one of Time Magazine's Best Inventions of 2021. Her research has been featured in Scientific American, The Guardian, and Science Friday.

== Leadership and public engagement ==
Isbister has held leadership roles in major HCI and game research conferences. She served as the technical program chair for CHI 2021 and has been a member of the steering committees for CHI and CHI-Play. She has also been an advisor for the Game Developers Conference (GDC) Education Summit and an editorial board member for ACM Transactions on Computer-Human Interaction.

== Awards and honors ==
- 1999: MIT Technology Review's Innovators under 35
- 2011: Alexander von Humboldt Foundation Research Fellowship for Experienced Researchers
- 2014–2015: Lenore Annenberg and Wallis Annenberg Fellowship in Communication at the Stanford Center for Advanced Study in the Behavioral Sciences.
- 2016: ACM Distinguished Member
- Founding Fellow of the Higher Education Video Game Alliance (HEVGA)
