= Paradigm (disambiguation) =

A paradigm, in science and epistemology, is a distinct concept or thought pattern.

Paradigm may also refer to:

== Science and medicine ==
- Paradigm, an experimental setup
- Programming paradigm, a style of programming, usually enforced by the programming language used
- Minimed Paradigm, an insulin pump made by Minimed/Medtronic
- Linguistic paradigm, the complete set of inflectional forms of a word.
- Algorithmic paradigm, a common generic method which underlies the designs of a class of algorithms
- Design paradigm – Paradigm from the sociology of science

== Books and publishing ==
- Paradigm (comics character), a character in the Marvel Comics
- Paradigm (Image Comics), an independent comic book series
- Paradigm (publisher), a Japanese publishing company
- Paradigm Publishing, the post-secondary division of EMC Publishing, LLC

== Other uses ==
- Paradigm Concepts, a small-press role-playing game publishing company
- Paradigm Entertainment, a video game studio
- Paradigm High School, a high school in South Jordan, Utah
- Paradigm Operations, an investment firm
- Paradigm Secure Communications, provider of satellite communications to the UK Ministry of Defence
- Paradigm Talent Agency, a talent and literary agency headquartered in Beverly Hills, CA
- Paradigm City, the setting of the anime series Big O
- V-STOL Pairadigm, an American aircraft design (intentional misspelling)
- Paradigm (video game), a point-and-click adventure video game
- "Paradigm", a song by Northlane from the 2019 album Alien
- "Paradigm", a song by Oceans Ate Alaska from the 2022 album Disparity
- "Paradigm", a song by The Plot in You from the 2022 album Swan Song
- "Paradigms", a song by Extol from the 2003 album Synergy

== See also ==
- Paradigm shift, a change in the basic assumptions of science
- Paradigm Shift (disambiguation)
- Paradigmatic analysis, in semiotics the analysis of paradigms embedded in a text
