= Paradigm Shift (disambiguation) =

Paradigm shift is a term to describe a change in basic assumptions within the ruling theory of science.

Paradigm Shift may also refer to:

- Paradigm Shift (album), a 1997 album by various artists
- The Paradigm Shift, a 2013 album by Korn
- "Paradigm Shift", a song by Candiria on the 1997 album Beyond Reasonable Doubt and 2002 album The C.O.M.A. Imprint
- "Paradigm Shift", a song by Liquid Tension Experiment on the 1998 album Liquid Tension Experiment
- Paradigm Shift, a book by Martin Cohen
- Paradigm Shift, a book by Zalman Schachter-Shalomi, and his theology
- Paradigm Shift, a finishing maneuver of professional wrestler Jon Moxley

== See also ==
- Paradigm (disambiguation)
