= Canonical model (disambiguation) =

A canonical model is a design pattern used to communicate between different data formats.

Canonical model may also refer to:

- Canonical ring in mathematics
- Kripke semantics § Canonical models in modal logic
- Relative canonical model in mathematics

== See also ==
- Canonical ensemble
