= Digital City Kyoto =

Urban informatization research project

Digital City Kyoto (Japanese: デジタル・シティ・京都) was a research project on urban informatization in Japan conducted from 1998 to 2001.. Inspired by the digital city movement that developed in Europe in the 1990s, particularly "De Digitale Stad" in Amsterdam, the project was set in Kyoto, a city with 1,200 years of history. It is reported to have aimed at constructing a "social information infrastructure" (an information system infrastructure for collecting and providing diverse urban information and supporting social activities) to support daily life by integrating web-based archives with real-time sensor information obtained from the physical city. Along with projects such as Amsterdam's "De Digitale Stad," it is mentioned in academic literature as an early attempt that influenced the formation of the subsequent smart city concept

== Design philosophy ==
In this project, the design policy "digital and physical make things real" was presented. This was intended not to create a fictional city in cyberspace, but to construct a digital city closely linked to physical Kyoto and to seek cooperation with the actual urban community.

While this design philosophy shared goals with European digital cities and North American community networks, it introduced advanced technologies such as 3D virtual spaces, intelligent agents, and real-time sensor data integration.

== History ==
In October 1998, the project was started by researchers from Kyoto University and NTT. In August 1999, the "Digital City Kyoto Experiment Forum" was established with the participation of multiple universities, local governments, private companies, and volunteers, and demonstration experiments were conducted through industry-government-academia-citizen collaboration. Researchers and designers from overseas also participated, and the project concluded in 2001 after an experimental phase of approximately three years.

== System configuration and technology ==
In order to manage urban information and facilitate social interaction, the following "three-layer architecture" was adopted.

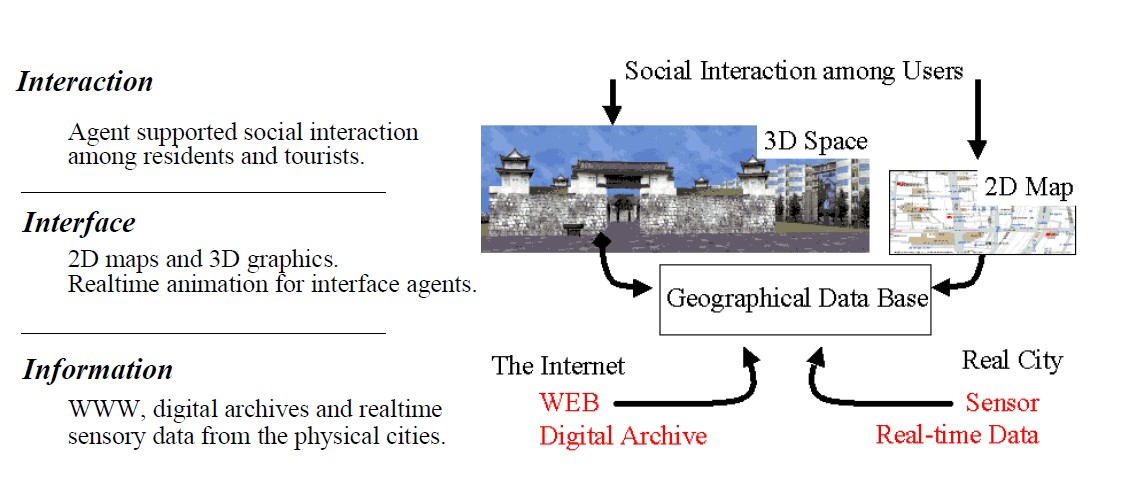
The three-layer architecture diagram at the time of the project design. The information, interface, and interaction layers are defined. The design divides the roles of information collection, presentation, and interaction among each layer.

Information Layer
This layer integrated web archives and real-time sensor information, with a Geographic Information System (GIS) at its core. It integrated location data and operation status of more than 600 city buses obtained from sensors at over 300 locations in Kyoto city, as well as traffic conditions, weather information, and live video from fire stations.

Interface Layer
This layer provided 2D maps and 3D virtual spaces. For the construction of the 3D space, 3DML, which is easy to learn, was adopted. This was because it was intended to allow information updates by non-expert users. As a result, the bazaar model was adopted as a software development method, with students and volunteers participating in the construction. As examples, streetscapes such as Shijo-dori and Nijo Castle were reproduced.

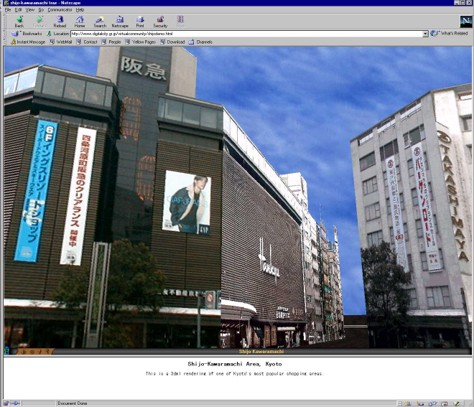
Virtual space of Shijo Kawaramachi in 2000 reproduced by 3DML. It is running on Netscape Navigator, demonstrating the web-based city reproduction technology of the time.

Interaction Layer
This layer supported interaction between residents and tourists. Katherine Isbister and others utilized Microsoft Agent technology and I-Chat to construct a "Digital Bus Tour" where a guide agent introduced Nijo Castle. Additionally, attempts were made to link avatars in 3D space with pedestrians in the real world to realize communication between tourists and residents.

== Academic evaluation ==
Since the conclusion of the project, Digital City Kyoto gained recognition in academic literature regarding smart cities from the following perspectives:

Formation of the smart city concept
Along with Amsterdam's "De Digitale Stad (DDS)," it is classified as a "3D web application" that simulated the daily life of a city, including streets, businesses, and malls.. It serves as a primary example of a city available to residents and visitors in a virtual form, and such early digital city attempts are analyzed to have influenced the formation of the modern smart city concept

Data processing and technical challenges
The methods used to record the traffic flow of pedestrians and vehicles provided the empirical basis for the concept of "urban sensing" (a method of understanding the dynamics of people, traffic, and the environment using data obtained from sensors and mobile devices placed in urban spaces).. Furthermore, it is categorized as research dealing with the "processing of large amounts of data," various interaction technologies, and challenges in information security

Evaluation as an urban and community model
Digital City Kyoto stands as a model for "connected communities" built upon broadband communication infrastructure. In addition to being analyzed as a case study for knowledge city, it is utilized as a case study for defining a common Enterprise Architecture (a framework for systematically designing the relationship between business, information, applications, and technical infrastructure in a city) in digital cities

== International collaborative activities ==
The project functioned as one of the hubs for international exchange among digital city researchers, holding international workshops in Kyoto three times starting in 1999. The proceedings have been published in the Lecture Notes in Computer Science (LNCS) series.

Researchers from various cities around the world participated in these workshops to discuss technical and social issues. These cities included Amsterdam (De Digitale Stad), Helsinki (Helsinki Arena 2000 / Virtual Helsinki), Bristol, Antwerp (Digital Metropolis of Antwerp), Turin, Vienna, and Oulu from Europe; Seattle (Seattle Community Network), Blacksburg (Blacksburg Electronic Village), and Davis (Davis Community Network) from the United States, where community networks were being developed; and Shanghai from Asia, which was working on urban informatization.

In addition, authorities on cities and networking, such as William J. Mitchell (MIT) and Barry Wellman (University of Toronto), participated and delivered lectures.

== Challenges and continuation ==
Retrospective studies in later years have organized the challenges faced by the project.

=== Challenges and lessons ===
- Limits of sustainability: Due to high dependence on research budgets, it was difficult to transition to an autonomous management structure or business model after the conclusion of the project period.
- Disagreements among stakeholders: The cautious stance of the government toward portal businesses and concerns regarding competition with the existing services of private companies acted as barriers to organizational coordination for social implementation.
- Limits of the engineering utopia: The initial demonstration experiments were positioned as an "unstructured and unorganized engineering utopia," and it is stated that the connection to the complex social contexts of the real world was limited.

=== Continuation of research ===
From July 2001, research activities were carried over to the Japan Science and Technology Agency (JST) project, "Universal Design for Digital Cities," aimed at exploring technical issues.
