= Language Grid =

Multilingual service platform

The Language Grid (Japanese: 言語グリッド, Hepburn: Gengo Guriddo) is an online multilingual service platform developed in Japan. It integrates language resources such as dictionaries, bilingual corpora, and machine translation systems through web services.

The project began operating in 2007, with research centered at the National Institute of Information and Communications Technology (NICT) and Kyoto University. Operational responsibility was transferred to the NPO Language Grid Association in 2017. The project received the Institute of Electronics, Information and Communication Engineers (IEICE) Achievement Award in 2012. Its software and service-oriented architecture were later used by other language-infrastructure projects, including the Language Application Grid (LAPPS Grid) in the United States and the European Language Grid.

== Background and design ==
The Language Grid originated in the "Intercultural Collaboration Experiment", conducted among universities in Japan, China, South Korea, and Malaysia in 2002. In the experiment, students collaboratively developed open-source software using existing machine translation systems.

The experiment identified limitations in the available machine translation systems, including difficulty in incorporating terminology specific to software development and individual projects. The Language Grid subsequently adopted a service-oriented architecture (SOA) to combine machine translation with other language resources.

Language resources such as specialized dictionaries, part-of-speech taggers, and machine translation systems were provided as web-based "atomic services". These services could be combined into "composite services" for particular multilingual applications. Experimental operation began in 2007, and the server software was released as open source in 2010.

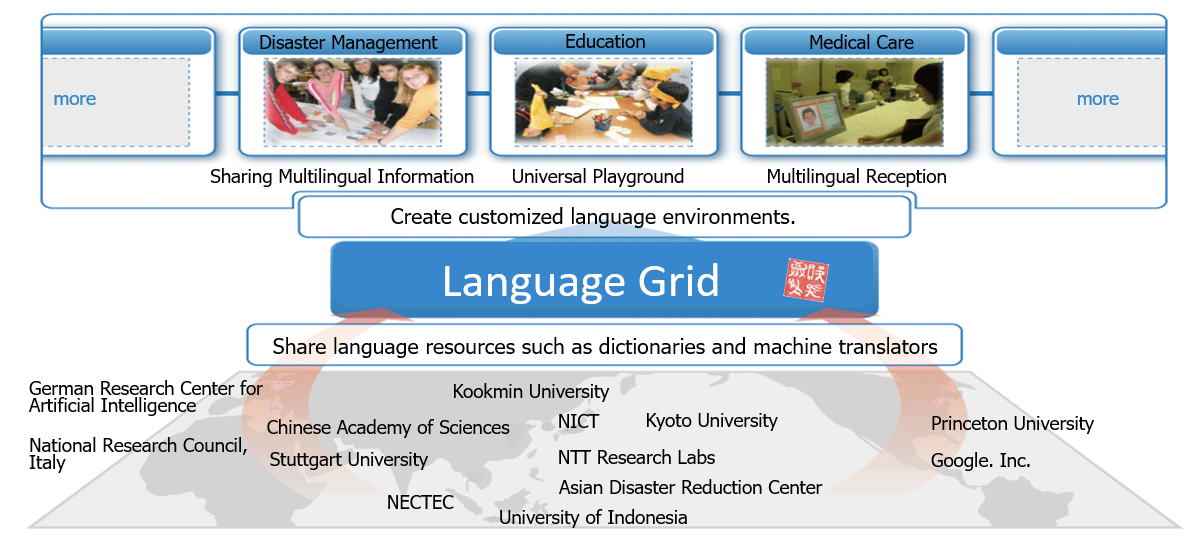
Conceptual structure of the Language Grid.

== Operation ==
The Kyoto Operation Center was established at Kyoto University in 2007 and connected atomic services to provide composite services. Operational responsibility for the center was transferred to the NPO Language Grid Association in 2017. Operation centers were later established in Thailand, Indonesia, and China and were interconnected.

According to a 2018 report by the project developers, 183 groups from 24 countries and regions participated in the Language Grid, and 226 services were shared. Cooperation was also established with the European Language Resources Association (ELRA) and the Linguistic Data Consortium (LDC).

== Adoption by third parties ==
The Language Grid software and architecture were used in several external projects.

=== Multilingual agricultural support (YMC model) ===
From 2011 to 2014, a rice-cultivation support project in Vĩnh Long province in the Mekong Delta of Vietnam used the Language Grid. The project involved the Vietnamese Ministry of Agriculture, the NPO Pangaea, and several universities and research institutes in Japan and Vietnam.

The project adopted the "Youth Mediated Communication (YMC)" model. Children of Vietnamese farmers learned about rice cultivation and computers and mediated communication between Japanese agricultural experts and their parents. The project was reported by Vietnamese media, including VietnamNet, Tuổi Trẻ, and Sài Gòn Giải Phóng.

=== Medical interpretation support ===
Wakayama University and the NPO Multicultural Center Kyoto jointly developed a multilingual medical communication system using the Language Grid. The system was introduced at hospital reception desks to support communication between foreign patients and medical staff.

=== Use in other language infrastructures ===
The service-oriented architecture and software of the Language Grid were used in several multilingual language-infrastructure projects.

The Language Application Grid (LAPPS Grid) in the United States, which received funding from the National Science Foundation (NSF), adopted Language Grid server software to support interoperability among natural language processing (NLP) tools. The European Language Grid (ELG) project, conducted from 2019 to 2022, also used a service-oriented approach.

Bond and Foster, in their work on the Open Multilingual Wordnet, cited the Language Grid as an example of an approach using open licenses and standardized interfaces for language resources.
