= International Conference on Autonomous Agents and Multiagent Systems =

Scientific conference series

The International Conference on Autonomous Agents and Multiagent Systems or AAMAS is the leading scientific conference for research in the areas of artificial intelligence, autonomous agents, and multiagent systems. It is annually organized by a non-profit organization called the International Foundation for Autonomous Agents and Multiagent Systems (IFAAMAS).

== History ==
The International Conference on Autonomous Agents and Multiagent Systems (AAMAS) is a highly respected joint conference that provides a quality forum for discussing research in intelligent computational agents and their interactions. It is a merger of three major international conferences/workshops, namely the International Conference on Autonomous Agents (AGENTS), International Conference on Multi-Agent Systems (ICMAS), and International Workshop on Agent Theories, Architectures, and Languages (ATAL). ICMAS is itself a merger of three formative workshops, each with an attendance of fewer than 50 researchers. At a meeting during IJCAI-93 held in Chambery, France in August 1993, the leaders of the European Workshops on Modelling Autonomous Agents in a Multi-Agent World, the Asian MAAC Workshops, and the North American Distributed Artificial Intelligence Workshops (Victor Lesser, Michael N. Huhns, Les Gasser, Barbara Grosz, Nicholas Jennings, Michael Wooldridge, Gerhard Weiss, Mario Tokoro, and Toru Ishida) began the planning for a combined conference, which resulted in the first ICMAS in San Francisco, CA, USA in 1995, attended by more than 500 researchers.

The AAMAS Conference is under the guidance and management of the International Foundation for Autonomous Agents and Multiagent Systems, which is incorporated as a 501(c)(3) non-profit organization in South Carolina, USA.

== Current and previous conferences ==
- 2024: Auckland, New Zealand (May 6-10)
- 2023: London, United Kingdom (May 29-June 1)
- 2022: Auckland, New Zealand (May 9–13)
- 2021: London, United Kingdom (May 3-May 7)
- 2020: Auckland, New Zealand (May 9–13)
- 2019: Montreal, Canada (May 13–17)
- 2018: Stockholm, Sweden (July 10–15)
- 2017: São Paulo, Brazil
- 2016: Singapore City, Singapore
- 2015: Istanbul, Turkey
- 2014: Paris, France
- 2013: Saint Paul, USA
- 2012: Valencia, Spain
- 2011: Taipei, Taiwan
- 2010: Toronto, Canada
- 2009: Budapest, Hungary
- 2008: Estoril, Portugal
- 2007: Honolulu, USA
- 2006: Hakodate, Japan
- 2005: Utrecht, The Netherlands
- 2004: New York, USA
- 2003: Melbourne, Australia
- 2002: Bologna, Italy

== Activities ==
Besides the main program that consists of a main track, an industry and applications track, and a couple of special area tracks, AAMAS also hosts over 20 workshops (e.g., AOSE, COIN, DALT, ProMAS, to mention a few) and many tutorials. There is also a demonstration session and a doctoral symposium. Finally, each year AAMAS features a bunch of awards, most notably the IFAAMAS Influential Paper Award. It publishes proceedings which are available online.

== See also ==
- The list of computer science conferences contains other academic conferences in computer science.
