= Thomas Erl =

Canadian author, and public speaker

- Born: 1967 (age 58–59)
- Occupation: Author
- Known for: Service-orientation design principles, service design Patterns, cloud computing
- Website: Thomas Erl website

Thomas Erl (born 1967) is a Canadian author, and public speaker known for major contributions to the field of service-oriented architecture. Author of eight books on Service Orientation, Erl defined eight widely accepted principles of service orientation.

== Biography ==
Erl is an SOA author, series editor of the Prentice Hall Service-Oriented Computing Series from Thomas Erl and editor of the Service Technology Magazine. Erl's primary work has been in laying down the core principles of Service Oriented Computing and service orientation. He also initiated and contributed in creating the catalog of SOA design patterns for building service-oriented systems.

As an entrepreneur, Erl founded SOA School in 2004, Cloud School in 2010, and Arcitura Education Inc. in 2011 as an umbrella corporation for his schools. SOA School established the SOA Certified Professional (SOACP) accreditation program and Cloud School established the Cloud Certified Professional accreditation program. Erl's eight books are used as part of the curriculum for SOA School and Cloud School and Erl helped develop these curricula.

Erl regularly participates in Gartner AADI Summits, the SOA Symposium and Cloud Symposium and the DoD SOA and Semantic Technology Symposium conferences where he delivers the keynote address. Over 100 articles and interviews by Erl have been published in publications, including the Wall Street Journal, SOA World Magazine, InformIT, and CIO Magazine.

== Work and publications ==
Erl is known for defining eight principles of service design for service-orientation. These principles were first published in 2005 in his book Service-Oriented Architecture: Concepts, Technology, and Design and in the 2005 edition of SOA World Magazine, and then became the basis for his book SOA Principles of Service Design, published in 2007.

Based on the principles of service design, Erl filed multiple patents on designing services and service modeling. In 2007, Erl transferred the Intellectual Property of one of his service modeling works to Red Hat for building service modeling tools. Based on the IP, Redhat created the tool Overlord.

Erl contributed to the WS-BPEL 2.0 Working Group Primer specifications, also published by OASIS.

He led a community movement which resulted in the publication of master pattern catalog for SOA. It was a three-year collaborative project from the SOA community producing pattern catalog of 85 patterns that were later compiled in the book, SOA Design Patterns. He also maintains a set of websites focused on SOA glossary, SOA principles, and SOA methodology.

Erl is the founding member of the SOA Manifesto Working Group and co-chairs the Education Committee. As of mid-May 2011, the SOA Manifesto had been signed by over 800 signatories and voluntarily translated to ten languages: Chinese, Dutch, French, German, Italian, Portuguese, Russian, Spanish, Tamil, and Hindi. He is also responsible for drafting the Annotated version of the SOA Manifesto.

Since his first publication in 2004, Erl has published seven additional books and is working with other authors on new books for his Prentice Hall series. All books are based on the set of principles and patterns that were initially covered in SOA Principles of Service Design and SOA Design Patterns. Each book has a different angle educating and teaching the concept, the philosophy, and architectural aspects of service orientation in the perspective of the targeted audience. Some of the recently published books focused on SOA governance, cloud computing, and REST. Erl's books, principles, and patterns have been cited by many articles and whitepapers on ACM, IEEE, HL7, OMG, Oracle Technology Network, MSDN, and IBM DeveloperWorks.

== See also ==
- SOA governance
- SOA Security
- Service Component Architecture
- Service-oriented modeling
- Web-oriented architecture
- Web service

== Bibliography ==
- Erl, Thomas (2004). Service-Oriented Architecture: A Field Guide to Integrating XML and Web Services. New York: Prentice Hall. pp. 541. ISBN 0-13-142898-5.
- Erl, Thomas (2005). Service-Oriented Architecture: Concepts, Technology & Design. Prentice Hall. p. 792. ISBN 0-13-185858-0.
- Erl, Thomas (2008). SOA Principles of Service Design. Prentice Hall. p. 608. ISBN 978-0-13-234482-1.
- Erl, Thomas (2009). SOA Design Patterns. New York: Prentice Hall. p. 856. ISBN 978-0-13-613516-6.
- Erl, Thomas (Anish Karmarkar, Priscilla Walmsley, Hugo Haas, Umit Yalcinalp, Canyang Kevin Liu, David Orchard, Andre Tost, James Pasley) (2009). Web Service Contract Design and Versioning for SOA. Prentice Hall. p. 847. ISBN 978-0-13-613517-3.
- Erl, Thomas (David Chou, John deVadoss, Nitin Gandhi, Hanu Kommalapati, Brian Loesgen, Christoph Schittko, Herbjorn Wilhelmsen, Mickey Williams) (2010). SOA with .NET and Windows Azure: Realizing Service-Architecture with the Microsoft Platform. Prentice Hall. p. 915. ISBN 978-0-13-158231-6.
- Erl, Thomas (Stephen G. Bennett, Benjamin Carlyle, Clive Gee, Robert Laird, Anne Thomas Manes, Robert Moores, Robert Schneider, Leo Shuster, Andre Tost, Chris Venable, Filippos Santas) (2011). SOA Governance: Governing Shared Services On-Premises and in the Cloud. Prentice Hall. p. 704. ISBN 978-0-13-815675-6.
