= Canonical model =

Design pattern used to communicate between different data formats

A canonical model is a design pattern used to communicate between different data formats. Essentially: create a data model which is a superset of all the others ("canonical"), and create a "translator" module or layer to/from which all existing modules exchange data with other modules. The canonical model acts as a middleman. Each model now only needs to know how to communicate with the canonical model and doesn't need to know the implementation details of the other modules.

== Details ==
A form of enterprise application integration, it is intended to reduce costs and standardize on agreed data definitions associated with integrating business systems. A canonical model is any model that is canonical in nature, meaning a model that is in the simplest form possible based on a standard enterprise application integration (EAI) solution. Most organizations also adopt a set of standards for message structure and content (message payload). The desire for consistent message payload results in the construction of an enterprise or business domain canonical model common view within a given context. Often the term canonical model is used interchangeably with integration strategy and often entails a move to a message-based integration methodology. A typical migration from point-to-point canonical data model, an enterprise design pattern which provides common data naming, definition and values within a generalized data framework. Advantages of using a canonical data model are reducing the number of data translations and reducing the maintenance effort.

Adoption of a comprehensive enterprise interfacing to message-based integration begins with a decision on the middleware to be used to transport messages between endpoints. Often this decision results in the adoption of an enterprise service bus (ESB) or enterprise application integration (EAI) solution. Most organizations also adopt a set of standards for message structure and content (message payload). The desire for consistent message payload results in the construction of an enterprise form of XML schema built from the common model objects thus providing the desired consistency and re-usability while ensuring data integrity.

== See also ==
- Canonical schema pattern
- Common data model
- Enterprise information integration
- Enterprise integration
- Information architecture
- List of XML schemas
- Service-oriented architecture
- Web service
- XML schema

== Bibliography ==
- "Enterprise Integration Patterns: Canonical Data Model".
- "Metadata Hub and Spokes (Canonical Data Domain)".
