= Institute of Electronics, Information and Communication Engineers =

Tokyo-based professional association

- Founded: May 1917; 109 years ago
- Type: Professional association
- Purpose: Electrical, Electronics, Communications, Computer Engineering, Computer Science and Information Technology
- Location: Shibakōen, Minato, Tokyo, Japan
- Origins: Study group of the Ministry of Communications
- Method: Industry standards, Conferences, Publications
- Members: 26,000+
- Key people: Masataka Nakazawa (President)
- Website: www.ieice.org

The IEICE - Institute of Electronics, Information and Communication Engineers (Japanese: 電子情報通信学会) is a Japanese institute specializing in the areas of electronic, information and communication engineering and associated fields. Its headquarters are located in Tokyo, Japan. It is a membership organization with the purpose of advancing the field of electronics, information and communications and support activities of its members.

== History ==
The earliest predecessor to the organization was formed in May 1911 as the Second Study Group of the Second Department of the Japanese Ministry of Communications Electric Laboratory. In March 1914 the Second Study Group was renamed the Study Group on Telegraph and Telephone.

As the adoption of the telegraph and telephone quickly mounted, there was increased demand for research and development of these technologies, which prompted the need to create a dedicated institute for engineers working in this field. Thus the Institute of Telegraph and Telephone Engineers of Japan was established in May 1917. Soon after its formation the institute began to publish journals and host paper presentations showcasing the latest developments in the field.

As the institute's scope of research broadened to accommodate new technical developments, it was rebranded as the Institute of Electrical Communication Engineers of Japan in January 1937, and then once again as the Institute of Electronics and Communication Engineers of Japan in May 1967. Finally, in January 1987, the institute renamed itself to the Institute of Electronics, Information and Communication Engineers to recognize the increasing research being conducted in computer engineering and information technology.

== Organization ==
The institution is organized into five societies:

- electronics society
- communications society
- information and system society
- engineering sciences society
- human communication engineering society

Each society has its own president and technical committees. Volunteers helped run various activities within the society, such as publications and conferences.

== Membership ==
The institute admits people to two categories of membership: member and fellow. Most of its members are based in Japan.
