= Signaling End Point =

SS7 network structure; SEPs are labeled SSP and SCP

In telecommunications, a Signaling End Point (SEP) is an SS7 endpoint. This is to be contrasted with a Signal Transfer Point (STP).

Examples include:

- Intelligent Network components such as Service Control Points (SCPs) and Service Switching Points (SSPs)
- Telephone exchanges implementing Telephone User Part (TUP) or ISDN User Part (ISUP)
- Mobile Switching Centers implementing MAP
