= Local government in New Zealand =

Local government in New Zealand currently consists of 78 local authorities that exist in a unitary system by which they exist and derive their powers from the central state rather than being independently empowered or sovereign themselves. The Local Government Act 2002 is the key legislation relating to local government in New Zealand. Elections for local authorities are held regularly every three years, most recently in 2025.

Local authorities broadly exist in two forms; territorial authorities which administer more local issues and regional councils which administer regional issues. Territorial authorities are not subservient to regional councils.

The 67 territorial authorities are primarily split into the purely symbolic categories of city (12) or district councils (53), with city councils generally being limited to just an urban area and district councils including both urban and rural areas. Both types of council have the same powers and responsibilities. Auckland and the Chatham Islands have specially legislated territorial authorities that are officially neither city or district councils.

Community boards are unincorporated local government bodies created by legislation or the relevant territorial authority to represent specific communities. In Auckland, local boards exist and are similar to community boards but with more powers and responsibilities.

There are 11 regional councils. In Auckland, Gisborne, Tasman, Nelson, and Marlborough the territorial authority has the power of a regional council (these are known as unitary authorities). The territorial authority for the Chatham Islands has some but not all of the powers of a regional authority.

Prior to major reforms in 1989, a system of counties and boroughs was the main form of local government in the country; before that there was a more federal system of provinces which was abolished in 1876. From 2001 to 2021, district health boards existed which had responsibility for managing health and disability services within their respective areas.

The Sixth National Government is currently looking to implement another major series of reforms to local government through a programme called Head Start.

== History ==
=== Provincial system, 1840–1876 ===
The model of local government introduced after New Zealand became a British colony in 1840 had nothing in common with the tribal system practised by Māori. The New Zealand Constitution Act 1852, a British Act of Parliament, established six provinces in New Zealand—Auckland, New Plymouth (later to be renamed Taranaki), Wellington, Nelson, Canterbury, and Otago—based on the six original planned settlements. These provinces were largely autonomous; each had an elected council and an elected chief official, called a superintendent. The New Provinces Act 1858 allowed for the creation of Hawke's Bay, Marlborough, Southland (abolished 1870) and Westland provinces, established between 1858 and 1873.

The Constitution Act also allowed the creation of municipal corporations, or local governments, within provinces. Municipal corporations could be overruled by the province in which they were located. One of the first municipal corporations established was the Wellington City Corporation, created in 1870.

Road boards and highway districts were established by each provincial council (bar Hawke's Bay) during the 1850s and 1860s. These still existed after the abolition of provinces, despite a desire from some to replace them. In 1882 the central government passed the Road Boards Act 1882, which defined their boundaries and established the purpose of the boards to be the administration of rural areas. Approximately 400 road districts were established. The last one, Waiheke Road District, was abolished in 1970.

The provinces have broken down because of their coming into conflict with the colonial government on many points, and especially on points of finance. Their doom was only a question of time, when it became obvious that they could not raise their own revenue; that they had to look to the general government to supply deficiencies; and that they could not borrow without the colony becoming liable.

— Colonial Treasurer Julius Vogel, 1876

The provinces were abolished in 1876 so that government could be centralised, for financial reasons. Provincial councils were dependent on central government for revenue, and all except Otago and Canterbury were in financial difficulties at the time of their abolition. Since then, Parliament has been the single and supreme source of power—local authorities are created by Parliament, can be abolished by it, and are responsible for discharging functions assigned by it. The former provinces are remembered in regional public holidays and sporting rivalries.

=== Counties and boards, 1876–1989 ===
From 1876 onwards, councils have had distributed functions, which vary locally. A system of counties similar to other countries' systems was instituted. The counties existed alongside management boards, for example drainage and rabbit boards, with between 600 and 750 of these authorities existing throughout the 20th century. There were half a dozen parliamentary bills attempting to reduce the number of these authorities, including one proposed in 1912 by Joseph Ward that would see all authorities abolished and replaced with 24 provinces. Despite this, the system of counties and boards remained until 1989, when the Fourth Labour Government set about comprehensively reorganising the local government system by implementing the current two-tier structure of regions and territorial authorities, and reduced the number of local bodies from approximately 850 to 86.

=== Amalgamation efforts ===
Auckland Council is the newest local authority. It was created on 1 November 2010 following a three-year process that began with the Royal Commission on Auckland Governance. Picking up on one of the Royal Commission's recommendations, the Fifth National Government combined the functions of the existing Auckland Regional Council and the region's seven previous city and district councils into one "super-city". Since then, the Local Government Commission has had a role considering changes to New Zealand's local government structure. Further amalgamations (of the councils in the Nelson–Tasman region, the Hawkes' Bay region, the Wellington region, the three Wairarapa districts, and the West Coast region) have been mooted but did not receive sufficient public support to progress further. Applications for secession from Auckland Council for the North Rodney and Waiheke Island communities have also failed.

On 25 November 2025, Local Government Minister Simon Watts and RMA Reform Minister Chris Bishop announced the Government would proposal abolishing regional councils and replacing them with "Combined territories boards," headed by mayors from the local district and city councils within the regions. Following feedback from local and regional councils, the Government backed away from implementing a "combined territories" board model of regional governance by early April 2026. On 5 May 2026, Watts and Bishop issued local and district councils with a three-month timeframe to amalgamate with other neighbouring councils, with merger plans being subject to review by the newly-established Ministry for Cities, Environment, Regions and Transport (MCERT). Regional councils were excluded from the merger consultation process. On 24 September, the Government announced that it would delay making decisions on amalgamating local councils until after the 2026 New Zealand general election.

On 18 November 2026, the Local Government Commission (LGC) proposed merging the Southland Region's four local and regional councils (Environment Southland, the Gore District Council, Invercargill City Council and Southland District Council) into a new regional Southland Council. This proposed local government entity would be headed by a mayor with 14 councillors elected from eight wards, and would be supplemented by several community boards. The LGC's proposal is separate from the Government's Head Start reform programme. Mayor of Invercargill Tom Campbell and Environment Southland chair Jeremy McPhail expressed tentative support for the proposal but said public consultation was important.

== Legislative framework ==
The New Zealand Government (by introducing bills, promulgating regulations and recommending Orders in Council) and the New Zealand House of Representatives (by enacting legislation) determine the overarching structure and delegated functions of local government. The general principle is that local government in New Zealand may only do what it is specifically authorised to do, and may not do anything that it is not authorised to do.

The following is a list of key local government statutes.

- The Local Government Act 2002 is one of the primary pieces of legislation for the sector, along with the Local Government Act 1974 (much of which is repealed). It provides for the purpose of local government and key functions including the council's governance and service provision responsibilities, strategic and financial planning requirements, and consultation procedures.
- The Resource Management Act 1991 (the RMA) has replaced the Town and Country Planning Act 1977 as the main local government planning legislation. The RMA also includes environmental protection laws.
- The Local Government (Rating) Act 2002 empowers local authorities to finance themselves by collecting property taxes.
- The Local Government Official Information and Meetings Act 1987 provides for the public right of access to council-held information, and for council decisions to be made in public meetings.
- Elections and local referendums are held in accordance with the Local Electoral Act 2001.
- Other responsibilities are prescribed under specific statutes such as the Sale and Supply of Alcohol Act 2012 and the Dog Control Act 2000.

Legislation conferring responsibilities on one or several local authorities may be passed from time to time (such as the Wellington Town Belt Act 2016).

=== Purpose ===
As defined in the Local Government Act 2002, the purpose of local government is:

- to enable democratic local decision-making and action by, and on behalf of, communities; and
- to promote the social, economic, environmental, and cultural well-being of communities in the present and for the future.

Between 2013 and 2019, the second purpose statement was, instead, "to meet the current and future needs of communities for good-quality local infrastructure, local public services and performance of regulatory functions in a way that is most cost-effective for households and businesses."

=== Oversight and accountability ===
Local authorities are functionally independent but are subject to audit requirements (for example, of their financial statements and plans) through Audit New Zealand under the authority of the controller and auditor-general. In addition, the Department of Internal Affairs carries out some monitoring functions on behalf of the minister of local government, who has a range of intervention functions that the minister may exercise in response to a poor-performing council. For example, the minister may appoint a Crown observer or, in extreme situations, remove the elected members and appoint commissioners. However, the primary way that local authority elected members are held accountable is through the triennial local elections.

== Structure ==
Map of regions (coloured) with territorial authorities delineated by black lines. City names are in all upper case, and district names have initial capitals.

New Zealand has two main types of local government, with authorities mainly either administrating local matters (territorial authorities) or regional matters (regional councils); 5 territorial authorities also administer regional matters (these are known as unitary authorities). There are currently 11 regional councils and 67 territorial authorities. Auckland Council is a unitary authority established in 2010 under its own legislation. Chatham Islands is a territorial authority established in a similar matter under its own legislation in 1995; it has powers similar to that of a unitary authority.

The external boundaries of a local authority can be changed by an Order in Council or through notice in the New Zealand Gazette. Several outlying islands do not fall within the jurisdiction of any territorial authority; for those islands, the Minister of Local Government acts as the territorial authority. The Department of Internal Affairs provides administration on behalf of the minister.

Regional councils	11 non-unitary regionals	5 unitary authorities (2 cities and 3 districts)	Chatham Islands	Kermadec Islands; New Zealand Subantarctic Islands; Three Kings Islands / Manawatāwhi
Territorial authorities	11 cities and 50 districts	5 unitary authorities (2 cities and 3 districts)	Chatham Islands	Kermadec Islands; New Zealand Subantarctic Islands; Three Kings Islands / Manawatāwhi
Notes	6 districts lie in more than one region	These combine the regional and the territorial authority levels in one	Special territorial authority	New Zealand outlying islands outside any regional authority (the outlying Solander Islands form a part of the Southland Region)

=== Governance and management ===
Each elected council is responsible for the local authority's governance and employs a chief executive, who is responsible for its management. The chief executive's role, outlined in the Local Government Act 2002, is to advise the council and implement its decisions, as well as employing staff and ensuring that all of a council's legal responsibilities are attended to. The term of a chief executive's employment is for up to five years, which may be extended to a maximum of seven years. Much of the governance and regulatory responsibilities of councils are transacted by committees or by the chief executive's staff, under delegation from the full council, although the level of delegation varies between councils. Councils may also choose to establish and delegate functions to companies or trusts (known as council-controlled organisations or council-controlled trading organisations when the local authority has the majority interest).

Regional councils and territorial authorities have different statutory responsibilities from one another, as well as other key differences in terms of their governance structures.

=== Regional government ===
Regional responsibilities include environmental management, regional aspects of civil defence, and public transport planning. Regional councils are funded through rates, subsidies from central government, income from trading, and user charges for certain public services. Councils set their own levels of rates, though the mechanism for collecting it usually involves channelling through the territorial authority collection system.

=== City and district government ===
The territorial authorities consist of thirteen city councils, fifty-three district councils and one special council for the Chatham Islands. A city is defined in the Local Government Act 2002 as an urban area with 50,000 residents. A district council serves a combination of rural and urban communities. Councillors are either elected through wards or at large. An additional member is the mayor, who is elected at large and chairs the council. Like regional councils, they too set their own levels of rates. Territorial authorities manage the most direct government services, such as water supply and sanitation, local transport infrastructure, the approval of building consents, public health, and libraries, museums and recreational facilities. While Parliament sets the roles of local government in legislation, the level and type of services supplied are determined locally in public meetings.

Most territorial authorities are wholly within one region, but six districts (Rotorua Lakes, Taupō, Stratford, Rangitikei, Tararua and Waitaki) fall within two or more regions. There is no formal reporting relationship between a regional council and the territorial authorities in its region, but they work together on some matters including civil defence and regional planning. The Local Government Act 2002 provides for the establishment of joint committees of multiple territorial authorities for these purposes.

==== Community boards ====
Territorial authorities may establish and delegate powers to community boards. The boundaries of community boards may be reviewed before each triennial local government election; this is provided for in the Local Electoral Act 2001. These boards, instituted at the behest of either local citizens or territorial authorities, advocate community views but cannot levy taxes, appoint staff, or own property. Auckland Council has, and other unitary authorities may (but do not yet) have, a system of local boards, which have a different set of responsibilities and accountabilities to community boards.

=== District health boards ===
New Zealand's health sector was restructured several times during the 20th century. The most recent restructuring occurred in 2001, with new legislation creating twenty-one district health boards (DHBs). These boards are responsible for the oversight of health and disability services within their communities. Elections for seven members of each district health board are held alongside elections for territorial and regional authorities. These members are directly elected by residents of their area, at-large (except for the Southern District Health Board, which draws its members from two constituencies), using the single transferable vote system. In addition, the Minister of Health may appoint up to four members. The Minister of Health also assigns who will be the chair and deputy chair of the board. There are currently twenty DHBs. The Minister has power to replace a Board considered to be performing poorly; Commissioners have been appointed on three occasions.

In April 2021, the Sixth Labour Government announced that the system of district health boards would be abolished and replaced by a single agency to be called Te Whatu Ora (Health New Zealand). In addition, Te Aka Whai Ora (the Māori Health Authority) was set up to regulate and provide health services to the Māori community. Following the passage of the Pae Ora (Healthy Futures) Act 2022 into law on 22 June 2022, the two agencies formally came into existence on 1 July 2022. In February 2024, the Sixth National Government passed legislation abolishing the Māori Health Authority by 1 July 2024, with the governing National, ACT and New Zealand First parties regarding a separate Māori health entity as "racially divisive."

=== Water supply and sanitation ===
Water supply and sanitation in New Zealand is provided for most people by infrastructure owned by territorial authorities, including city councils in urban areas and district councils in rural areas. As at 2021, there are 67 asset-owning organisations.

Central government is developing a major programme of nationwide reform with the aim of rationalising the provision of services for three waters. It is proposed that a small number of large publicly owned entities will be established to own and manage the three waters assets across the country. The reforms include complete separation of asset ownership from the existing territorial authorities. The nationwide reform programme is being developed in partnership with local government and iwi/Māori as the Crown’s Treaty partner.

Charges for water services typically represent around 40% of a rates bill in an urban area. In a submission on the Local Government Act 2002 Amendment Bill 2016, the Hauraki District Council made the following comments about the sustainability of local authorities if the revenue associated with water and transport were transferred to other bodies:

We note and share LGNZ’s concern that removing a large degree of a rural local authority’s expenditure through transferring water and transport services to another body will have significant financial implications for the sustainability of that local authority. The net effect of such transfers, particularly in geographical areas comprising a number of rural local authorities, could be the need for the formation of larger authorities – amalgamation by stealth. It is of upmost concern to us that our local democracy and decision-making could be lost as a result.

In late October 2021, Local Government Minister Nanaia Mahuta unveiled the Labour Government's "Three Waters reform programme". The proposals envisaged taking the administration of New Zealand's storm-water, drinking-water and wastewater from existing local councils and existing territorial bodies and transferring these tasks to new local-government authorities. These proposed reforms would transfer management of water services and assets to the control of four new water entities by July 2024. These entities would be managed by independent boards jointly elected by a group set up by councils and by Māori iwi (tribes). The opposition National and ACT parties vowed to repeal the Three Waters reforms if elected into government.

On 13 April 2023, the Labour Government announced a major overhaul of the Three Waters programme, renaming it the Water Services Reform Programme. The proposed four water services entities were expanded into ten entities but would have retained the same split co-governance structure consisting of representatives of local councils and mana whenua representatives.

In November 2023, the newly-formed Sixth National Government announced plans to repeal the Three Waters legislative framework as part of their 100-day action plan. On 14 February 2024, the National-led government passed urgent legislation repealing the previous Labour Government's Three Waters legislation. The Government also announced plans to introduce replacement legislation allowing councils to form their own groups or council-controlled organisations to manage water supply and infrastructure.

On 8 August 2024, Local Government Minister Simeon Brown announced that council-controlled organisations would be able to borrow money for water infrastructure from the Local Government Funding Agency. Under the Government's first Local Water Done Well legislation, local councils have a year to develop plans for funding water services they need and ensuring their financial sustainability. This legislation passed into law on 28 August 2024.

== Elections ==
Local elections are held every three years ending on the second Saturday in October in New Zealand to elect local government politicians using postal voting. Anyone over the age of 18 can vote in the place they live or in a council area they pay rates in. Mayors and local councillors are elected in the cities and districts, while regional councillors are elected in the regions.

Councils run their own elections, determining the number of councillors, number of wards, whether to have Māori wards, and various other aspects of the elections. Councils choose which voting system to use, either first-past-the-post or single transferable vote. Councils choose their own rules regarding campaigning and advertisements, though it is required that before the final day these must be taken down.

In 1989, the Fourth Labour Government launched a series of reforms to local government that meant the number of local bodies (and thus local elections) was greatly reduced. The provinces of New Zealand held elections from 1853 until they were abolished in 1876.

== Remuneration ==
Under the Remuneration Authority Act 1977 and clauses 6 and 7A of Schedule 7 of the Local Government Act 2002, pay rates for members of local bodies are set each year by the Remuneration Authority. In 2021 the annual salary scales ranged from $296,000 for the Mayor of Auckland to $2,030 for members of several community boards.

In the 1895 Local Government Bill, which failed to pass, it was proposed council chairmen should be paid £400 a year. Section 15 of the Local Bodies' Proceedings and Powers Act 1953 allowed up to £750 (in 2022 equivalent to about $48,000) for Mayors of Auckland, Wellington, Christchurch and Dunedin and £500 for the chairmen of counties.

== See also ==
- Local Government New Zealand, represents the interests of local government bodies
- New Zealand Local Government, a monthly trade magazine published since 1964
- New Zealand local government and human rights
