= Mobicents =

Open source VoIP platform

- Operating system: Cross-platform
- Type: VoIP Platform
- License: AGPL v3
- Website: www.mobicents.org

Mobicents is an Open Source VoIP Platform written in Java to help create, deploy, manage services and applications integrating voice, video and data across a range of IP and legacy communications networks.

In the scope of telecom Next Generation Intelligent Networks (NGIN), Mobicents fits in as a high-performance core engine for Service Delivery Platforms (SDP), IP Multimedia Subsystems (IMS) and Intelligent Core Network (IN).

== History ==
Mobicents LLC, the original company behind Mobicents was created in 2004. It was acquired by Red Hat in June 2007. After Red Hat sunsetted Mobicents in 2011, TeleStax was created to take over the leadership and Commercial Services around the Mobicents Platform.

== See also ==
- JBoss
- JSLEE
- Signalling System No. 7
- List of SIP software
