= Basic call state model =

In Intelligent Network and CAMEL switching, a BCSM is a Basic Call State Model.

== Types ==
- O-BCSM (Originating BCSM)
- T-BCSM (Terminating BCSM)

A fundamental concept for IN control is the basic call state model (BCSM). When a call is processed by an exchange, the call goes through a number of pre-defined phases. These phases of the call are described in the BCSM. The BCSM generally follows the ISUP signalling of a call

== State machine description ==
In the following IN BCSMs, bold Detection Points and Points In Call are also present in the CAMEL Ph1 subset.

TODO: Expand to Ph2,3,4

=== O-BCSM ===
==== Points in call ====
- 1. O_Null & Authorize Origination Attempt
- 2. Collected_info (Merged with 1. in CAMEL Ph1)
- 3. Analyze_Info
- 4. Routing & Alerting (Merged with 3. in CAMEL Ph1)
- 5. O_Active
- 6. O_Exception

==== Detection Points ====
- 1 Origination_Attempt_Authorized
- 2 Collected_Info
- 3 Analyzed_Info (this is the only Statically armed DP, others are dynamically armed using "Request Report BCSM (RRBE)" message by the SCP)
- 4 Route_Select_Failure
- 5 O_Called_Party_Busy
- 6 O_No_Answer
- 7 O_Answer
- 8 O_Mid_Call
- 9 O_Disconnect
- 10 O_Abandon

=== T-BCSM ===
==== Points in call ====
- 7. T_Null & Authorize Termination_Attempt
- 8. Select_Facility & Present_Call
- 9. T_Alerting (Merged with 8. in CAMEL Ph1)
- 10. T_Active
- 11. T_Exception

==== Detection Points ====
- 12 Termination_Attempt_Authorized
- 13 T_Called_Party_Busy
- 14 T_No_Answer
- 15 T_Answer
- 16 T_Mid_Call
- 17 T_Disconnect
- 18 T_Abandon

== Messages ==
basic INAP call example

- Initial Detection Point (IDP)
- RRBE (Request Report BCSM)
- Event Report BCSM (ERB)
- Connect (CON)
- Continue (CUE)
- Send Charging Information (SCI)
- ACH (Apply Charging)
- ACR (Apply Charging Report)
