= JSLEE =

Java programming API

The JSLEE (JAIN Service Logic Execution Environment) is a Java programming language API for developing and deploying network services. It was standardized in Java Specification Requests JSR 22 and JSR 240 by Sun Microsystems and OpenCloud (now Metaswitch) with the participation of more than 80 operators and software vendors.

The technical specification is designed so that implementations can meet the stringent requirements of communications applications, like high throughput, low latency, scalability, availability and software portability. Furthermore, it allows software developers to write robust components as it integrates the ACID properties of transactions into the programming model.

The JSLEE environment acts as an integration point for multiple network resources and communications protocols.

== See also ==
- Mobicents - Open source JSLEE Project
- Parlay - Open API for the telephone network
- Parlay X - Open APIs defined as set of simple-to-use, high-level, telecom-related Web services
