= Avaya 9600-series IP deskphones =

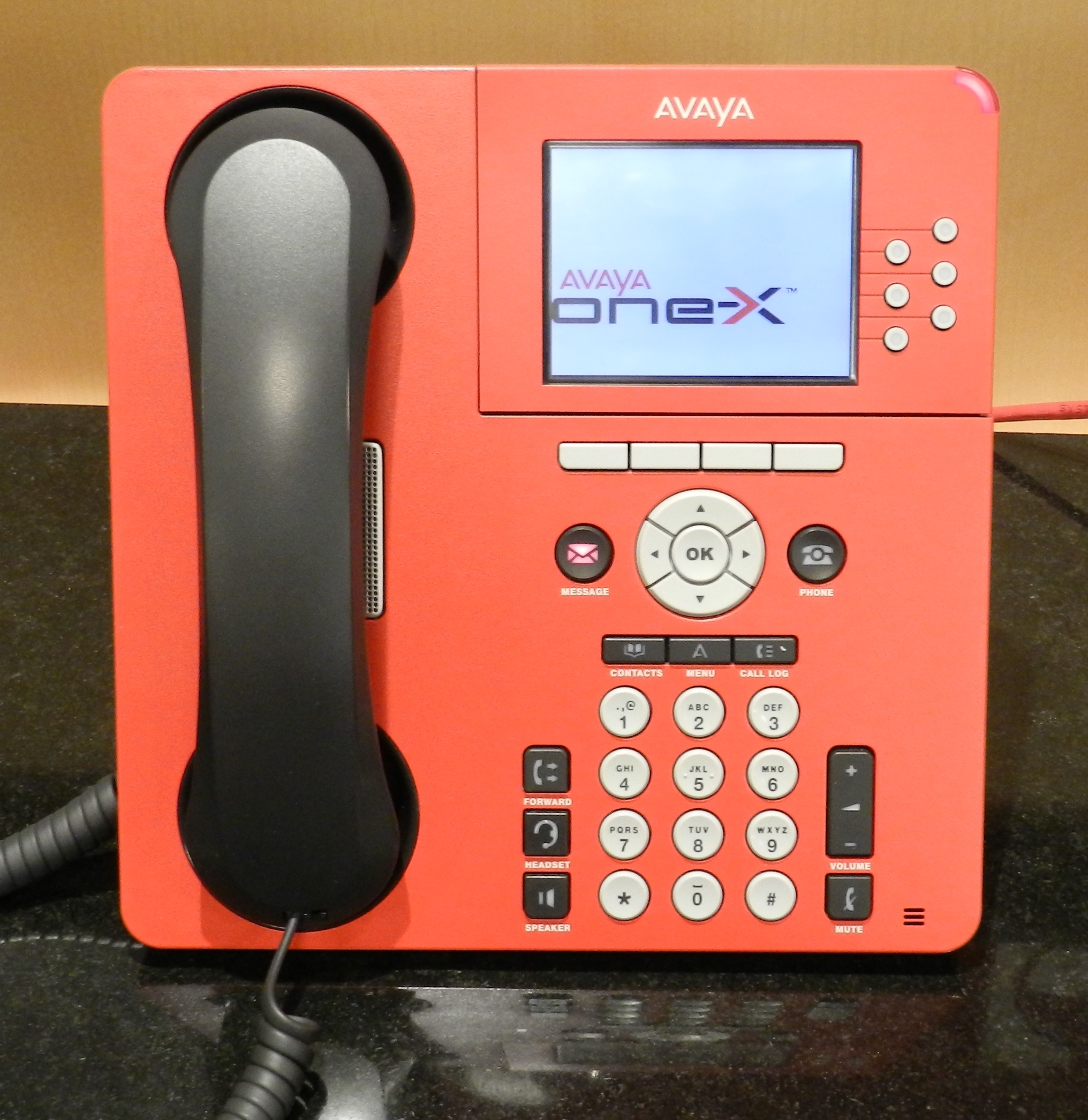
9640 IP Deskphone

Avaya 9600-series IP deskphones are 15 different desk handset devices that are used for unified communications. The phones are compatible with the Avaya Aura platform of products and IP office systems. The systems add high-quality voice codecs like the G.722 codec and new menus over older IP phone series. The 9620 includes 16 MB of flash memory and the 9630 includes 32 MB of flash memory.

The model 9620L-PDB IP Deskphone and the 6220T-TSG-DD are special use phones that have been specifically tested to meet the Committee on National Security Systems type accepted class B certification for use in Sensitive Compartmented Information Facilities (SCIF).

== History ==
In 2006 the phone series started out with release 1.0 and only ran H.323 software and started with just the 9620 and 9630 phones. These phones were the follow on to the 4600 series and continued to use the 46xxsettings.txt configuration files for customer settings. In 2007 the 9610 and 9650 phones were added and the "G" suffix models 9630G and 9640G identified models with gigabit Ethernet interfaces. By the beginning of 2009 there were 11 different models. The 9670G was added and models with no suffix, "G" suffix, and "L" suffixes. By the end of 2009 a "C" suffix was added and expanded the list to 15 different phones.

=== Security ===
In 2006 the phones added a client to give them the ability to create a VPN tunnel to IPSec compliant VPN gateways from other vendors. The phones are certified for operation within military networks by the Joint Interoperability Test Command testing labs.

=== Firmware ===
In 2006 a firmware upgrade was made available for free for this series of phones adding the ability to use the phone with all SIP phone systems. The book SIP Security has an extensive section covering security of the 9600-series phones. SIP is now considered the de facto standard for connecting all unified communications including VoIP end devices. Firmware release 2.0 also provides Secure Real-time Transport Protocol (SRTP) and Transport Layer Security (TLS).

In 2009 firmware version 3.0 and 3.1 were released adding the ability to display JPG and JPEG images as screen savers, and supporting multicast receive audio. With the 3.1 firmware release these phones have the ability to create a VPN connection back to a corporate network to allow working remotely with a secure connection back into the office network. The VPN client built into the phones supports Avaya VPN gateways and other vendors gateways. By connecting the PC to the phone this will support both phone and computer operations back to the corporate network systems.

=== Current models ===
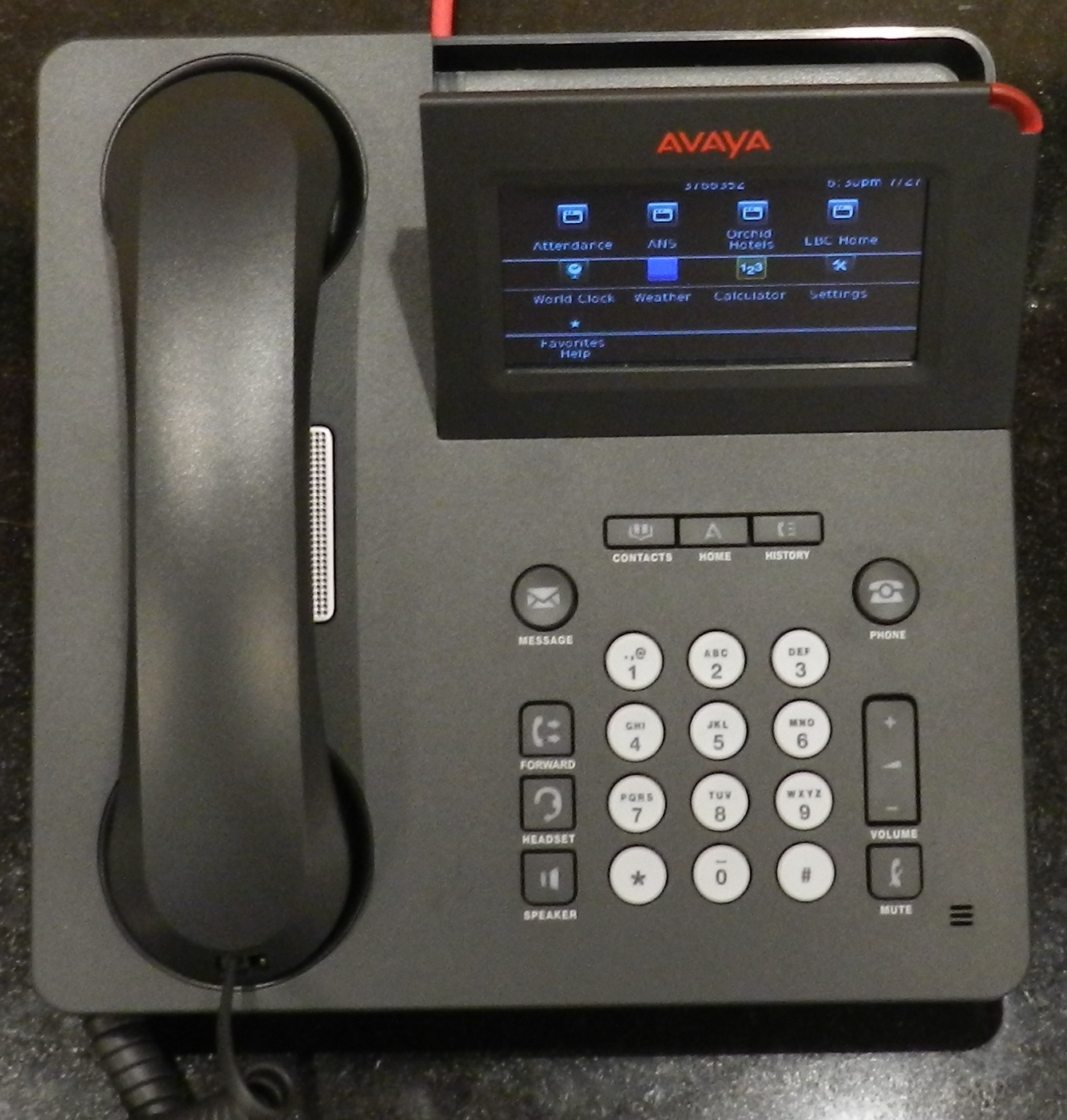
9621G IP Deskphone

The 9601 is a Session Initiation Protocol (SIP) only phone for use with SIP Voice over Internet Protocol (VoIP) systems.

The 9608 phone is an eight-line phone with directory and speed dial functions, with a monochrome display and four programmable keys. The device also supports Bluetooth headsets.
The 9611G phone has a 3.5-inch color display and supports eight lines. The device has a built in gigabit Ethernet switch to allow a PC to connect to the network through the phone.
The 9621G phone has a 4.3-inch color touchscreen.
The 9641G phone has a 4.7-inch color touchscreen. The device has a built in gigabit Ethernet switch to allow a PC to connect to the network through the phone.
The 9620L phone is a PoE Class 1 phone.
The 9630G and the 9640G phones have advanced features and the 9630 can handle up to 24 lines.
The 9650C phone is a receptionists style phone or is used by contact center agents.
The 9670G phone has a 6.4-inch touchscreen, and is a cross between a PC and a phone. New applications can be downloaded into the phone to have access to Internet-based information.

All of these phone models are designated as Class 1 PoE devices typically only drawing between 2.2 and 2.7 watts. This low power consumption decreases the total cost of ownership. All of the phones except for the 9601 can run firmware that allows communications over the H.323, or SIP protocols.

== Functionality ==
The Avaya 9600 phone series supports DHCP functionality. This means that you can plug the phone into a standard Ethernet port and it will obtain an IP address for connectivity on a data network. Using this data connectivity the phone series is able to transmit Voice over Internet protocol or VoIP. The voice traffic is compressed to provide efficiency of transmission using one of the standard CODECs such as G711 or G729. In this way a data network connection can Multiplex both voice and data transmissions over a single physical link.

Avaya 9600 phone models support a built in switch functionality. This allows a computer to be plugged into the back of the phone. The phone implements network bridge functionality so that a single data switch port from a data switch in the closet can support both voice and data services which is a significant savings over separate hard wired TDM connections for voice and data.

Virtual Private Networking capabilities built into Avaya 9600-series phones means that companies with teleworkers may ship one of these phones to a remote location that has a cable modem or DSL Internet connection and with no manual configuration on the part of the remote worker the phone will connect back to the corporate network Call Router and Signaling Server and make calling to the voice extension possible no matter where the phone is located.

Caller ID, or Caller Identification is a phone feature that is able to display the phone number of the subscriber originating the voice call from the PSTN to the digital phone network such that the recipient is able to determine who is originating the call.

== See also ==
- Avaya Energy Saver
- Energy-Efficient Ethernet
