= New Zealand local government and human rights =

Local government bodies in New Zealand have responsibilities under the Local Government Act 2002 (LGA) to perform a wide range of functions, and provide a wide range of services to the communities they represent. There is not an explicit focus on human rights in New Zealand local government, or any direct reference to human rights under the LGA. Local bodies in New Zealand are required to act in a way that is consistent with the rights guaranteed under the New Zealand Bill of Rights Act 1990 (NZBORA). Internationally there is growing consideration of how local government does and could promote and protect fundamental rights.

== Local government in New Zealand ==
The purposes and functions of local government in New Zealand are provided for in a number of statutes. The key statute is the LGA. It states the purpose of local government as being to enable democratic local decision-making and action by, and on behalf of, communities. It requires local authorities to act in an open, transparent and democratically accountable manner.

== Participation in local government ==
Article 25 of the International Covenant on Civil and Political Rights (ICCPR) outlines the democratic rights of citizens, which include rights to take part in the conduct of public affairs and to vote and be elected at periodic elections. The electoral rights of New Zealand citizens are further outlined in section 12 of NZBORA. However, these rights only relate to parliamentary elections.

New Zealand citizens have the right to participate in the conduct of local government in two direct ways: by voting in triennial elections, or standing for election to a local body. There are also opportunities provided under the LGA for citizens to indirectly exercise democratic rights.

=== Representation and participation ===
Research indicates that there is not a diverse range of candidates seeking election to local authorities in New Zealand. The numbers of women, Māori, other ethnic minorities and young people standing for election are low. Voter participation in local elections is also relatively low, with turnout in the 2013 election being particularly low, prompting consideration of how to increase participation, possibly through the introduction of online voting.

==== Māori representation ====
Minority rights are an integral part of international human rights law. Efforts have been made by central government and other organisations to increase Māori participation in local government. The LGA specifically requires local authorities to maintain and improve opportunities for Māori to contribute to local government decision-making processes, and to facilitate participation by Māori in decision-making.

In October 2010, the Human Rights Commission (HRC) produced a report that looked at Māori representation and participation in local government. The publication of the Report was prompted by the Government's failure to adopt a recommendation of the Royal Commission on Auckland Governance that three councillors representing Māori sit on the new Auckland Council, established in November 2010. The HRC was particularly critical of the decision given Māori representation in local government was one of the top ten race relations priorities for 2010.

In 2004, the Bay of Plenty Regional Council (Environment Bay of Plenty (EBOP)) introduced direct Māori representation via a system that operates on the same basis as that providing for Māori seats in Parliament. Māori voters in the region can choose to participate in local body elections as a voter on either the general or Māori electorate rolls. Once elected, Māori councillors have the same roles and responsibilities as other councillors. Despite the system and attempts to increase Māori representation, the number of Māori elected has remained disproportionately low compared with the region's total Māori population.

Since the passage of the Local Electoral Amendment Act 2002, all New Zealand councils have had the option of establishing Māori constituencies or wards, by resolution of council, challengeable by a poll of all voters.

=== Environment Canterbury legislation ===
In 2010 the government enacted the Environment Canterbury (Temporary Commissioners and Improved Water Management) Act 2010) to affect the replacement of Canterbury Regional Council's democratically elected representatives with government-appointed Commissioners. The changes to Environment Canterbury (ECan) were made based on a perceived need for improvement of water management in the region. The decision was controversial, as it was largely perceived as removing local government democratic voting rights. Such rights have been described as "ingrained in the national psyche and a legitimate expectation of the citizenry."

The ECan Act also removed the access of Canterbury citizens to the Environment Court for proposed changes to the Regional Policy Statement and regional plans, and in respect of applications for Water Consent Orders. The right of access to justice is guaranteed under Article 14 of the ICCPR, and in section 27 of NZBORA. The implications of this decision were controversial, with public law academic Professor Philip Joseph questioning, "why should citizens in the Canterbury region be forced to accept lesser rights of local government than other citizens?"

=== Indirect democracy: decision-making requirements ===
The LGA states, “A local authority should make itself aware of, and should have regard to, the views of all its communities.” Section 78 of the LGA specifically requires local authorities to have regard, in making decisions, to the views and preferences of persons likely to be affected by or have an interest in the matter. However, under that provision alone local authorities are not required to undertake any consultation process or procedure. A number of principles of consultation are outlined in the Act. These focus on the need to encourage people who may be affected by, or have an interest in decisions, to present their views.

== Human rights response to local government reform ==
In early 2012, the National Government announced a programme of local government reform, “Better Local Government.” The first phase of review culminated in the passing of the Local Government Act 2002 Amendment Act 2012 (the Amendment Act). The Amendment Act made a number of changes to local government, including altering the statutory purpose of local government and giving greater powers of intervention to the Minister of Local Government.

The Bill introduced a new purpose statement for local government that excluded provision for promotion and protection of four previously listed community well-beings; social, cultural, environmental and economic well-being. The new purpose statement was proposed as a means of helping to clearly define the role of councils and assist them to plan and prioritise activity. Many perceived the amendment as a response to a perception of overspending by local authorities.

Key stakeholders made submissions to the Local Government and Environment Select Committee criticising the Amendment Act. Local Government New Zealand (LGNZ) was concerned about the impact of the changes on local democracy. In particular, it expressed concern that the Bill undermined democratic accountability of elected members to their communities, and gave the Minister too much power vis-à-vis elected representatives. The HRC was concerned that the extension of Ministerial discretion would erode the autonomy of elected representatives, and would "conflict with a central purpose of local government which is to enable democratic local decision-making and action by, and on behalf of, communities."

The HRC also expressed to the Select Committee its concern that the new purpose statement did not seek to supplement the existing purposes of local government, with their references to community well-being, but to replace them. The Commission stated it considered reference to the well-beings as important for clarifying and confirming the role and responsibilities of local government in relation to economic, social and cultural rights. The commission's submission referred to New Zealand's ratification of the International Covenant on Economic, Social and Cultural Rights (ICESCR), and consequent obligations to respect, protect and fulfill related rights. It stated that it considered “any erosion of recognition of these human rights obligations risks undermining New Zealand’s international commitments.” The Commission specifically recommended that the four well-beings be retained alongside the proposed new purpose statement.

== Local government and NZBORA ==
NZBORA applies only to acts done “by any person or body in the performance of any public function, power, or duty conferred or imposed on that person or body by or pursuant to law”, in addition to the executive, legislative and judicial branches of government. This means NZBORA is applicable to acts done by local government bodies, since law confers functions, powers and duties on them.

This means local authorities must guarantee all of the rights contained in NZBORA for citizens. It means local authorities must ensure all citizens are guaranteed the right to be free from discrimination on the grounds listed in section 21 of the Human Rights Act 1993 (HRA). A local authority will act or omit to act in a manner inconsistent with section 19 NZBORA if it limits the right to freedom from discrimination, and this is not, under section 5 of NZBORA, a justified limitation on that right.

== Local government and ICESCR rights ==
Human rights instruments guarantee the right to be free from discrimination on ethnic and cultural grounds. The HRC has engaged in relationships with local authorities as part of its own work to promote human rights and encourage harmonious race relations, through initiatives such as the New Zealand Diversity Action Programme. The HRC through its engagement with local communities has sought to demonstrate its belief in the value of local partners addressing local issues and fostering local communities’ well-being on behalf of central government. The HRC worked alongside Nelson City and Tasman District Councils to develop a reporting system for local incidents of racism.

Article 6 of ICESCR concerns rights to work. The Mayors’ Taskforce for Jobs (MTFJ) is a local government initiative addressing issues relating to employment and livelihood. MTFJ was founded in 2000, when 200,000 New Zealanders remained unemployed, despite 2000 being the deadline set by the 1994 Prime Ministerial Taskforce on Employment, which had a goal that no New Zealander would be out of work or training for more than 6 months. Now a national network of 100% of Mayors, MTFJ has a vision that all young people under 25 be engaged in appropriate education, training, work or positive activities in their communities. MTFJ decided that communities, led by their Mayors, could play a crucial role in fostering youth employment opportunities by working with local employers, iwi and training institutions.

Article 15 of ICESCR outlines the right of all citizens to take part in cultural life. The LGA makes it an obligation on all territorial authorities to provide free library membership to all community members.

Article 12 of ICESCR recognises the right of everyone to the enjoyment of the highest attainable standard of physical and mental health. There is a focus on the right to health in New Zealand's system of local government. In 2001, legislation created 21 district health boards (DHBs) with responsibility for the oversight of health and disability services within communities. There are now 20 DHBs. DHB representatives are democratically appointed in triennial elections.

== Local government and human rights internationally ==
Local government is one of 15 thematic issues currently being considered by the Human Rights Council Advisory Committee (the committee). In 2014, the Committee at its Twelfth Session recalled the Human Rights Council's Resolution 24/2. This Resolution requested that the Committee prepare, from within existing resources, a research-based report on the role of local government in the promotion and protection of human rights. The Resolution required the committee to look at human rights mainstreaming in local administration and public services, and to compile best practices and main challenges for local government and human rights in its report.

The result of the Resolution is that the Office of the Human Rights Commissioner is now engaged in a research-based review of how local government bodies around the world promote and protect human rights, and how they could improve in this area.

=== International Council on Human Rights Policy ===
The International Council on Human Rights Policy (ICHRP) is currently undertaking research as to how human rights policy can help local government bodies become more effective and legitimate. It has expressed a view that while legally states are primarily responsible for enforcing human rights standards (because of having ratified them), accountability extends to all levels of government and institutions with devolved authority. The ICHRP's research has found few local authorities use human rights explicitly. It has suggested the human rights framework is relevant to local government since decentralisation of government activities increases access to and availability of public services, which relate to economic and social rights.
