= Initial detection point (telephony) =

The IDP receives a message (IDP Message) initiated by the SSP (service switching point) and transmitted to the service control point SCP via the INAP protocol. The Service Switching Point (SSP) receives a message (ISUP Message) initiated by the Calling Party, this could be an IAM (Initial Address Message). The SSP evaluates the nature of the message, in the case of the IAM the called and calling party numbers. From this it determines whether it can route the call or whether it needs further instructions. In this case if the SSP does require further instructions it sends an IDP to a service control point SCP via an IN protocol. The protocol may be INAP but could be CAMEL, or bespoke INAP flavours such as Ericsson INAP, Nokia INAP, Siemens INAP or Huawei INAP.
