= Signal Transfer Point =

Telecommunications router that relays SS7 messages

SS7 network structure

A Signal Transfer Point (STP) is a node in an SS7 network that routes signaling messages based on their destination point code in the SS7 network. It works as a router that relays Signalling System No. 7 (SS7) messages between signaling end-points (SEPs) and other signaling transfer points (STPs). Typical SEPs include service switching points (SSPs) and service control points (SCPs). The STP is connected to adjacent SEPs and STPs via signaling links. Based on the address fields of the SS7 messages, the STP routes the messages to the appropriate outgoing signaling link. Edge STPs can also route based upon message body content using deep packet inspection techniques, and can provide address translations and screen content to limit the transfer of messages with dubious content or sent from unreliable sources. To meet stringent reliability requirements, STPs are typically provisioned in mated pairs.

These 'routers' are connected just by signaling links; they do not have users attached (where a user could be a mobile station (MS), a PSTN user in case of a public terrestrial network, or a piece of terminal equipment at the end of an ISDN B channel). SEPs send signaling messages to other SEPs, but the messages are normally routed via the SEP's adjacent STPs. An STP's main function is to identify the best path for two SEPs to communicate. A typical application would be for two SEPs to agree on the use of a shared data path (e.g., using ISUP to initiate a voice call between a user on one SEP and a user on the second SEP). In this way, STPs route signaling messages (for starting, maintaining or finishing any kind of calls originated by the SEPs' attached users) while avoiding disabled intermediary STPs.

A signaling message typically never goes directly from a given SEP to the destination SEP: the message would normally have to pass through the initiating SEP's adjacent STP so that it can be routed to the destination SEP. In some applications, however, SEPs might be directly connected with signaling links; this would typically be done to enhance robustness or performance between two critical SEPs. Such mesh network configurations are also common in Europe, where STPs have not found widespread deployment.

In some cases, signaling messages can be originated by the STP to learn about the state of the signaling network. Some examples include:

- an STP may send route set test messages to probe the availability of a particular SEP;
- it may send low-level MTP messages to an adjacent signaling point to check the Bit Error Rate (BER) on a particular signaling link; or
- it may let other adjacent signaling points know that it is going out of service; in this way, the adjacent signaling points will try to avoid this OOS STP.

A given piece of equipment can implement both SEP and STP functionality. This is commonly done in some SSPs. This is also seen in Signaling Gateways that also have Application Server (AS) functionality as defined by the IETF.

Some UMTS number portability solutions are implemented in STPs. In UMTS, the STP provides Global Title Translation (GTT), which may be used to route queries from a gateway MSC (GMSC) to the HLR. Note that for every call to an MS, the call is first routed to the MS's Gateway MSC.

== See also ==
- Signaling End Point
- Signaling System 7
