= Teligent Telecom =

- Type: Private
- Industry: Telecommunications
- Founded: September 2008
- Headquarters: Nynäshamn, Sweden
- Key people: CEO: Einar Linquist; CFO: Fredrik Johansson; COO: Ulf Lindstén
- Products: Service Delivery Platforms, Voicemail, Intelligent networking applications
- Revenue: ▲SEK 102.5 million (2009)
- Net income: ▲SEK 5.1 million (2009)
- Number of employees: 100+ (Q4 2010 Worldwide)
- Website: www.teligent.se

Teligent Telecom is a company based in Nynäshamn Sweden, which produces and markets Value Added Services for Telecommunication operators, such as Voicemail, Mobile Office, IN services, IMS Service Brokers and Real-time Charging Gateways. It is a private company with offices in Sweden, Germany, France, Morocco, Malaysia, UK, United States, Philippines and Singapore.

== Products ==
Teligent Telecom is a global supplier of telecommunication solutions for Value-added services to telecommunication operators. The company's product range includes Converged Network Services, Next Generation Messaging (such as Voicemail), Enterprise Services (such as Virtual office solutions), Mass Calling Systems for Televoting and Real Time Charging Enablers.

All of Teligent's products are based on its Service Delivery Platform the 'Teligent P90/E' which has technology patents in the US, Europe, and China.

== History ==
A Swedish consortium with executives from the Swedish telecom industry submitted an offer covering the former Teligent AB Business Unit for Messaging, Charging and Platform in August 2008 that led to a buy-out agreement which was signed on 5 September 2008. The transaction also involved (besides the entire Business Unit Messaging, Charging and Platform operations in Sweden) the Teligent operations in Morocco, France and the US. It included all relevant personnel, the existing customer base, all patents and IPR, as well as the Teligent AB brand name, domain names, etc.

On 23 January 2009, Teligent Telecom AB merged with Teligent Pte Singapore Groups and acquired local offices in the Singapore, Philippines and Malaysia.
