= Service layer =

Networking middleware

In intelligent networks (IN) and cellular networks, service layer is a conceptual layer within a network service provider architecture. It aims at providing middleware that serves third-party value-added services and applications at a higher application layer. The service layer provides capability servers owned by a telecommunication network service provider, accessed through open and secure Application Programming Interfaces (APIs) by application layer servers owned by third-party content providers. The service layer also provides an interface to core networks at a lower resource layer. The lower layers may also be named control layer and transport layer (the transport layer is also referred to as the access layer in some architectures).

The concept of service layer is used in contexts such as Intelligent networks (IN), WAP, 3G and IP Multimedia Subsystem (IMS). It is defined in the 3GPP Open Services Architecture (OSA) model, which reused the idea of the Parlay API for third-party servers.

In software design, for example Service-oriented architecture, the concept of service layer has a different meaning.

== Service layer in IMS ==
The service layer of an IMS architecture provides multimedia services to the overall IMS network. This layer contains network elements which connect to the Serving-CSCF (Call Session Control Function) using the IP multimedia Subsystem Service Control Interface (ISC). The ISC interface uses the SIP signalling protocol.

=== Elements of the IMS service layer ===
The network elements contained within the service layer are generically referred to as 'service platforms' however the 3GPP specification (3GPP TS 23.228 V8.7.0) defines several types of service platforms:

- SIP Application Server
- OSA Service Capability Server
- IM-SSF

=== SIP Application Server ===
The SIP Application Server (AS) performs the same function as a Telephony Application Server in a pre-IMS network, however it is specifically tailored to support the SIP signalling protocol for use in an IMS network.

=== OSA Service Capability Server ===
An OSA Service Capability Server acts as a secure gateway between the IMS network and an application which runs upon the Open Services Architecture (this is typically a SIP to Parlay gateway)

=== IM-SSF ===
The IM-SSF (IP Multimedia Service Switching Function) acts as a gateway between the IMS network and application servers using other telecommunication signalling standards such as INAP and CAMEL.

== Service layer in SOA ==
In service-oriented architecture (SOA), the service layer is the third layer in a five-abstraction-layer model. The model consists of Object layer, Component layer, Service layer, Process layer and Enterprise layer. The service layer can be considered as a bridge between the higher and lower layers, and is characterized by a number of services that are carrying out individual business functions.

== See also ==
- Service layers pattern
- IP Multimedia Subsystem (IMS)
- Open Services Architecture (OSA)
- Hierarchical internetworking model
- Multitier architecture
