= MSSP =

MSSP may refer to:

- Managed Security Service Provider, who provides security services for companies
- Microsoft Smooth Streaming Protocol, a computer networking protocol designed to support adaptive media streaming
- Mobile Service Switching Point, see Service Switching Point
- Medicare Shared Savings Program, established by section 3022 of the Affordable Care Act
- Master Synchronous Serial Port, a module of a PIC microcontroller that is used for communication with other peripherals
- Missionary Society of St Paul (Malta)
