= Edge STP =

Computer Hardware (Computer part)

An edge STP (STP for signal transfer points) is a networking hardware device embedded with software that performs routing, signaling, firewall, and packet conversion functions. The primary purpose of an edge STP is to unify networks that use various transports and signaling protocols – such as SS7, SIP, SIGTRAN, TDM, IP, etc. – into cohesive service environments. Unified environments are simpler for telecommunications companies to manage, and also enable them to cost-effectively transition to next-generation networks based on the Internet Protocol (IP).

Edge STPs support voice, data and video services. Among their key functions are optimizing traffic flow; providing advanced load sharing between network segments; managing multi-node congestion; translating addresses; filtering and screening packets; and protecting important information. They also provide on-the-fly translation between networks that employ different transports and signaling protocols. That translation capability enables, for example, services that were designed to run on SS7 to run on IP networks instead, and vice versa.

== Edge STPs at work ==
Unlike traditional STPs, Edge STPs process packet traffic away from the network core, where sensitive applications and customer information reside. They can either perform simple packet routing or deep packet inspection (DPI) that supports content-based routing. DPI is a time-consuming and processor-intensive function that can bog down core network functions and reduce customer response times. Shifting it to the network edge improves overall network performance.

Moving functionality to the network edge, companies can add, modify, and expand services without disrupting core network functions. Edge STPs perform a broad range of roles in evolving telecommunications networks. They include optimizing services such as short message service (SMS) for improved performance; providing precise security policies to subnetworks; preventing service interruptions during switch migrations; and connecting server-based applications to switched networks. In the latter scenario, telecommunications companies that are implementing IP subnetworks use Edge STPs to integrate them with their existing SS7 signaling infrastructure.

== See also ==
- Common Channel Signaling
- SS7
- SIGTRAN
- STP
- Signaling Gateway
