= OneAPI =

OneAPI may refer to:

- OneAPI (compute acceleration), for different compute accelerator (coprocessor) architectures
- OneAPI (GSM telecom), a set of application programming interfaces
