= Royal Commission on Auckland Governance =

New Zealand royal commission

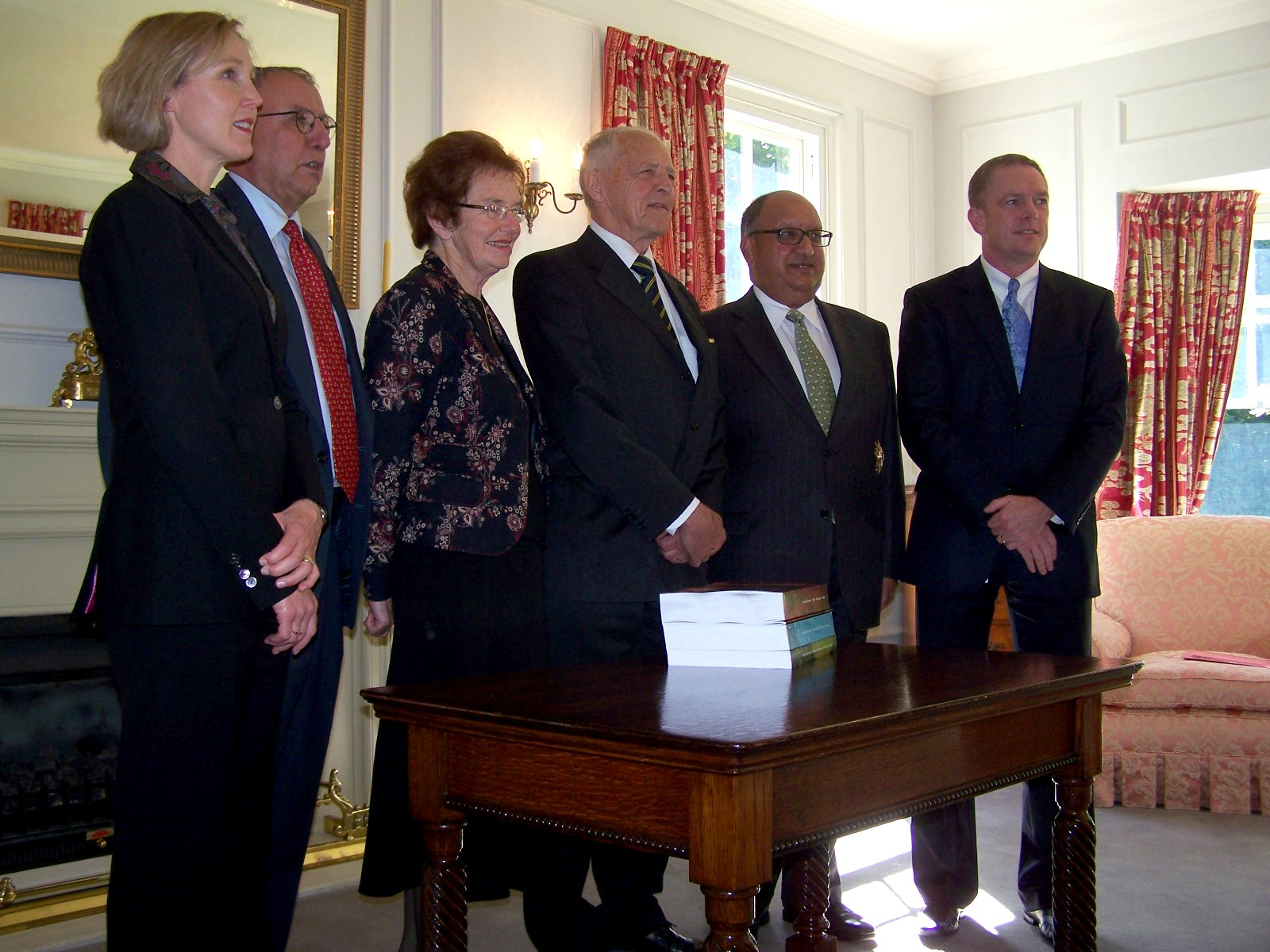
The Royal Commission presented its report to the Governor-General on 25 March 2009. From left: Heather Harris (commission executive officer), David Shand (commissioner), Dame Margaret Bazley (commissioner), Hon Peter Salmon QC (chairperson), Hon Anand Satyanand (governor-general), and Brendan Boyle (Secretary of Internal Affairs)

The Royal Commission on Auckland Governance was established by the New Zealand Government to investigate the local government arrangements of Auckland.

The Labour Government of the time announced a Royal Commission into the governance of Auckland on 30 July 2007 and it appointed three Commissioners and terms of reference at the end of October of that year. The Commissioners were David Shand, Peter Salmon, and Dame Margaret Bazley.

The Commission consulted with the public, including Māori, and, along with a raft of other conclusions, suggested the creation of what became known as "the Auckland Supercity", with the setting up of a single Auckland council to replace the Rodney District Council, North Shore City Council, Waitakere City Council, Auckland City Council, Manukau City Council, Papakura District Council, Franklin District Council and the Auckland Regional Council.

The National Party came into power before the Royal Commission released its recommendations. After the release of the Royal Commission report the government made the following high-level decisions:

- One unitary Auckland Council as the first tier of governance
- One mayor for Auckland (see Mayor of Auckland) with governance powers, elected at large by the region's residents and ratepayers
- Twenty councillors to sit on the Auckland Council (eight elected at large and 12 elected from wards)
- Twenty to 30 local boards across the region as the second tier of governance
- The final number of local boards, and the boundaries of the Auckland Council, wards and local boards to be determined by the Local Government Commission

== Unimplemented recommendations ==
Some recommendations of the Royal Commission, which have not been adopted or implemented:

- 6A The Auckland Council should include a vision for the region in its spatial plan.
- 6B The Mayor of Auckland's annual "State of the Region" address should describe progress towards the attainment of the vision.
- 19C: "Leadership support and development programmes for elected councillors should be strengthened."
- 21D: Auckland Council CCOs and their statements of intent should be subject to performance review by the proposed Auckland Services Performance Auditor.
- 21A 22A Two Māori members should be elected to the Auckland Council by voters who are on the parliamentary Māori Electoral Roll.
- 22B There should be a Mana Whenua Forum, the members of which will be appointed by mana whenua from the district of the Auckland Council.
- 22D The Auckland Council should ensure that each local council has adequate structures in place to enable proper engagement with Māori and consideration of their views in the local councils' decision-making processes. Where appropriate, current structures and/or memoranda of understanding should be transferred to local councils.
- 24F Auckland Council should consider creating an Urban Development Agency, to operate at the direction of the Auckland Council, with compulsory acquisition powers.
- The Auckland Council should determine the extent to which responsibilities for the delivery of stormwater services are shared between local councils and Watercare Services Limited.
- 26I Watercare Services Limited should be required by legislation to promote demand management.
- 26M Watercare Services Limited should be required to prepare a stormwater action plan.
- 27D The Auckland Council should prepare an e-government strategy as an intrinsic part of its proposed unified service delivery and information systems plan.
- 28A The Auckland Council should work closely with consumers, the industry, and central government agencies to develop a climate change and energy strategy for the region, including monitoring and reviewing electricity security of supply performance, and industry planning and regulation impacting the Auckland region.
- 30A The Auckland Council should develop a Regional Waste Management Strategy, including strategies for management of organic waste and integration of waste management with other environmental programmes.
- 32F To promote the widespread adoption of the unified service delivery framework the Auckland Council should

a) give Auckland Council CCOs providing council services the opportunity to share the unified service facilities if they wish.
b) require Auckland Council CCOs providing council services to adopt the council's ICT infrastructure standards.

- 32G A statutory position of an independent Auckland Services Performance Auditor (to be appointed by the elected Auckland Council on the joint recommendation of the Chair of the Commerce Commission and the Auditor-General) should be created to provide assurance to the council and the public that the Auckland Council is providing high-quality services in a cost-effective way. The role of the Performance Auditor will include

a) reviewing the adequacy and relevance of CCO performance targets.
b) protecting the consumer's interests and advocating for them in respect of the reliability and affordability of council services. This will include reviewing services in terms of established customer service standards.
c) in the case of Watercare Services Limited, undertaking three-yearly efficiency and effectiveness reviews, incorporating international comparative industry benchmarking and an evaluation of service levels, efficiency, affordability of water, and demand management performance.

== Criticism ==
Some aspects of the reorganisation were contentious, such as whether all of the Auckland Region should be integrated into the super city, and whether the new structure allowed sufficient local democracy.

=== Local board powers ===
Critics argued that there was little space for "local" democracy in the new "local government" setup for Auckland, with the proposed "local boards" having little power, such as having no funding or staff of their own, and being forbidden from undertaking numerous government roles, especially where those roles might clash with regional functions such as transport or utilities. Local Government Minister Rodney Hide, in the opinion of The New Zealand Herald, ignored concerns about the "powerlessness" of the local boards. Hide argued that "local boards will engage like never before" and "represent their local communities and make decisions on local issues, activities and facilities".

A further concern was that candidates for local boards would have to campaign without knowing the scope of the local board's financial resources, and that a salary for a local board member of around $37,100 was insufficient for what amounted to a full-time position.

=== Inclusion of rural areas ===
Numerous residents of and (to some degree) the councils of the Franklin and Rodney Districts opposed their inclusion in the new supercity, and instead campaigned for retention of their councils, or inclusion with other, more rural-focused councils in the north (such as merging the areas north of Puhoi with the Kaipara District area) or the south.

There was a perception that these rural areas would receive very little benefit in terms of infrastructure for their rates' money, and that they would be swallowed up by an Auckland that has different interests and character than their communities. Politicians such as Rodney Hide answered that inclusion is necessary to allow a regional approach to the wider interests of the region, and that tangible benefits would ensue for all of Auckland's communities. Also, that changing the boundaries in 2010 would have a domino effect on the restructuring of the ward system for the future Auckland councillors. In turn, the opponents of inclusion argued that big-city developers preferred the inclusion of the rural areas in the Auckland Council boundaries to make development and new subdivision of rural land easier.

=== Ward sizes and boundaries ===
Several editorialists criticised the size and composition of wards for the election of Auckland Council councillors. The criticism ranged from the wards being too big (and thus throwing together communities with few common interests), to some ward boundary lines being drawn against the local understanding of what constituted their community.

More serious criticism was centred around the fact that urban wards contained significantly more people than some rural wards (and thus received less influence in the future Council per person) and regarding the small number of Councillors for all of Auckland (with fewer Councillors per head than Aucklanders have MPs representing them in Parliament), and the institution of two-member wards (meaning that contenders would have to field much larger and more costly election campaigns). Editorialist Brian Rudman accused the Local Government Commission of attempted gerrymandering in its draft proposal for one particular ward.

=== Controversies over council-controlled organisations ===
In early 2010 a further dispute emerged. As set out in the third bill establishing the future Auckland Council, major functions (such as transport, water services and Auckland waterfront development) were to be devolved into council-controlled organisations (CCOs) controlled by unelected boards, operating at "arm's length" from Council. This separation, as argued by backers of the move, had become necessary due to "local politicians [having] failed to deliver the results expected of them."

The Government's plan to outsource the majority of the council's functions was decried by numerous people (including the main mayoral contenders, Len Brown, and to a lesser degree, John Banks) and groups across the political and societal spectrum – from the Auckland Regional Council and many community boards, to Local Government New Zealand, and organisations considered to be National Party-friendly such as the Auckland Chamber of Commerce and the Employers & Manufacturers Association. Supporters included the New Zealand Council for Infrastructure Development, a right-wing think tank.

The introduction of Auckland Transport, the CCO for transport functions (with more than half the city's future rate spend), was discouraged even by the government's own Treasury and Department of Internal Affairs, as well as other departments.

The main proponents of the CCO system, Prime Minister John Key, Local Government Minister Rodney Hide and Transport Minister Steven Joyce, remained adamant about the introduction (and the appropriateness) of the system. Others, like the New Zealand Council for Infrastructure Development called the claim that the mayor and council would have no ability to hold the CCOs accountable "farcial nonsense".

The New Zealand Herald, Auckland's largest newspaper, ran a series of articles and editorials in March 2010 criticising the proposed move, which was described as "The lockout of Auckland", arguing that elected councillors would have little control over the day-to-day decisions, and potentially even over massive changes such as Auckland's waterfront development or the city's transport focus. The main Herald editorials noted that the CCO concept introduced "undemocratic elements" in a number of ways, and "could not stand". They also noted that saddling the super city with this system would be the most serious handicap, and a recipe for a "frustrated and disappointed citizenry".

Several editorialists went even further and accused the ACT party, and especially Rodney Hide, of preparing Auckland's assets for a sell-off, and of setting up the structure to allow it even before Aucklanders got to vote on the matter – all under the guise of a "manufactured crisis". Others, while criticising the lack of democratic oversight, dismissed concerns about asset sales, noting that amalgamation was likely to result in surplus real estate.

The Sunday Star-Times noted in an editorial that "we'll merely end up trading in political dysfunction for a quasi-commercial dysfunction forced on us by the National-led government." It also criticised, in the case of Auckland Transport, that with most of the expertise, staff and planning ability being held in the "semi-autonomous" CCO, the council would not have the central planning and policy role as claimed by the proponents of the system, but would instead have to share (or compete for) this role with Auckland Transport. It also argued that the Royal Commission suggested a strong council and subservient CCOs, not vice versa.

New Zealand Local Government magazine followed the story, and criticised the lack of transparency that would ensue from establishing independent CCOs.

The changes were seen as a potential "neutering" of the power of the new Auckland mayor to implement the policies on which he would be elected. Further criticism was the lack of accountability of the proposed CCOs, which would not have to hold public board meetings, or provide agendas or minutes. Groups such as 'Heart of the City' (the Auckland CBD business association) also called for stronger oversight and mayoral powers over the CCOs.

=== Independent Māori Statutory Board ===
One of the proposals that was criticised by some during the initial Royal Commission proposal was the provision of elected Māori members of the council (analogous to the Māori seat representation in Parliament).

This was later dropped from the relevant establishing laws. However, it later became clear that instead, the city's new Independent Maori Statutory Board, appointed by Te Puni Kōkiri, would receive "broadly ordained powers". These included the right to send one or two delegates, with full voting powers, to any council committee meeting, and dealing with "the management and stewardship of natural and physical resources". This unelected representation of Māori on committees voting on matters such as transport and infrastructure, as well as the fact that the advisory board requested (and initially received) a $3.4 million yearly budget, created significant public concern and debate.
