= Open Services Access =

The Open Service Access or OSA is part of the third generation mobile telecommunications network or UMTS. OSA describes how services are designed in a UMTS network.

The standards for OSA are being developed as part of the 3rd Generation Partnership Project (3GPP). The standards for OSA are published by ETSI and 3GPP.

The API for OSA is called Parlay, (or Parlay/OSA or OSA/Parlay) as the APIs are developed jointly in collaboration by 3GPP, ETSI, and the Parlay Group. These APIs can be freely downloaded from the web. Sometimes OSA would be misspelled as Open Services Architecture or even confused with Open systems architecture.

== See also ==
- Parlay Group
- CAMEL
- IP Multimedia Subsystem
- Multitier architecture
- Service layer
