= Customized Applications for Mobile networks Enhanced Logic =

Customized Applications for Mobile networks Enhanced Logic (CAMEL) is a set of standards designed to work on either a GSM core network or the Universal Mobile Telecommunications System (UMTS) network. The framework provides tools for operators to define additional features for standard GSM services/UMTS services. The CAMEL architecture is based on the Intelligent Network (IN) standards, and uses the CAP protocol. The protocols are codified in a series of ETSI Technical Specifications.

Many services can be created using CAMEL, and it is particularly effective in allowing these services to be offered when a subscriber is roaming, like, for instance, No-prefix dialing (the number the user dials is the same no matter the country where the call is placed) or seamless MMS message access from abroad.

== CAMEL entities ==
- GSM Service Control Function (gsmSCF)
- GSM Service Switching Function (gsmSSF)
- GSM Specialized Resource Function (gsmSRF)
- GPRS Service Switching Function (gprsSSF)

== Specifications ==
CAMEL specification were published in phases, with four phases having been established As of 2007, each building on the previous. Phases 1 and 2 were defined before 3G networks existed, and as such support adding IN services to a GSM network, although they are equally applicable to 2.5G and 3G networks. Phase 3 was defined for 3GPP Releases 99 and 4, and hence is a GSM and UMTS common specification, while Phase 4 was defined as part of 3GPP Release 5.

In line with other GSM specifications, later phases should be fully backwards compatible with earlier phases; this is achieved by means of the Transaction Capabilities Application Part (TCAP) Application Context (AC) negotiation procedure, with each CAMEL phase is allocated its own AC version.

=== Phase 1 ===
CAMEL Phase 1 defined only very basic call control services, but introduced the concept of a CAMEL Basic call state model (BCSM) to the Intelligent Network (IN). Phase 1 gave the gsmSCF the ability to bar calls (release the call prior to connection), allow a call to continue unchanged, or to modify a limited number of call parameters before allowing it to continue. The gsmSCF could also monitor the status of a call for certain events (call connection and disconnection), and take appropriate action on being informed of the event.

Phase 1 was defined as part of Release 96 in 1997.

=== Phase 2 ===
CAMEL Phase 2 enhanced the capabilities defined in Phase 1. In addition to supporting the facilities of Phase 1, Phase 2 included the following:

- Additional event detection points
- Interaction between a user and a service using announcements, voice prompting and information collection via in-band interaction or Unstructured Supplementary Service Data (USSD) interaction
- Control of call duration and transfer of Advice of Charge Information to the mobile station;
- The ability to inform the gsmSCF about the invocation of the supplementary services Explicit Call Transfer (ECT), Call Deflection (CD) and Multi-Party Calls (MPTY)
- The ability, for easier post-processing, of integrating charging information from a serving node in normal call records

Phase 2 was defined as part of 3GPP Releases 97 and 98, in 1998, although it is referenced in the stage 1 specification of Release 96.

=== Phase 3 ===
The third phase of CAMEL enhanced the capabilities of phase 2. The following capabilities were added:

- Support of facilities to avoid overload
- Capabilities to support Dialed Services
- Capabilities to handle mobility events, such as (Not-)reachability and roaming;
- Control of GPRS sessions and PDP contexts
- Control of Mobile Originated SMS through both circuit-switched and packet-switched serving network entities
- Interworking with SoLSA (Support of Localised Service Area). Support for this interworking is optional;
- The gsmSCF can be informed about the invocation of the supplementary service Call Completion to Busy Subscriber (CCBS)

Phase 3 was released as part of 3GPP Releases 99 and 4 in 1999.

=== Phase 4 ===
The fourth phase of CAMEL built on the capabilities of phase 3. The following features were defined:

- Support for Optimal Routing of circuit-switched mobile-to-mobile calls
- The capability for the gsmSCF to create additional parties in an existing call (Call Party Handling)
- The capability for the gsmSCF to create a new call unrelated to any other existing call (Call Party Handling - new call)
- Capabilities for the enhanced handling of call party connections (Call Party Handling)
- Control of Mobile Terminated SMS through both circuit-switched and packet-switched serving network entities
- The capability for the gsmSCF to control sessions in the IP Multimedia Subsystem (IMS)
- The gsmSCF can request the gsmSSF to play a fixed or a variable sequence of tones

With CAMEL Phase 4, it is possible that only a limited subset of the new functionalities is supported, in addition to the complete support of CAMEL Phase 3.

Phase 4 was released as part of 3GPP Release 5 in 2002.

== See also ==
- Open Services Architecture
- IP Multimedia Subsystem
- Service layer
- Camel
