= TDM-to-packet conversion =

TDM-to-packet conversion is the process of converting a digital signal in TDM format (typically a 64 Kbit/second signal encoded with mu-law or A-law compression) into packets (typically RTP packets) for carrying over a packet network such as the Internet.

The conversion process may include recoding with a different codec, silence suppression, comfort noise generation and other tricks that can decrease the bandwidth requirement or improve the perceived voice quality of the result.

Note that this is a conversion of the signal, not a tunnelling, unlike TDM over IP, which aims at transporting a TDM signal unchanged across an IP network.

== See also ==
- Voice over IP
