= Service delivery framework =

A service delivery framework (SDF) is a set of principles, standards, policies and constraints to be used to guide the designs, development, deployment, operation and retirement of services delivered by a service provider with a view to offering a consistent service experience to a specific user community in a specific business context. It establishes a structured approach for organizing processes, roles, technologies and governance mechanisms involved in service delivery. An SDF is the context in which a service provider's capabilities are arranged into services.

The term service delivery framework (SDF) has been used interchangeably with the term service delivery platform (SDP), which is a set of technology components that provide capabilities. A service delivery framework governs and guides the use of service delivery platform capabilities.

== Current use ==
Service delivery frameworks fall into two categories.

1. A general reference model for the delivery of services. Such a service delivery framework is developed to be broadly applicable to a particular industry. The TM Forum Service Delivery Framework , as an example, is developed for the telecommunications industry.
2. A more refined reference model for service delivery. This kind of SDF, being more specific, applies to a particular market or service provider. The Immunisation Service Delivery Framework of the District Health Boards of New Zealand offers an example.

Some vendors of service delivery platforms use the term "service delivery framework" to describe their product offerings.

== In context ==
An illustration of the role of a service delivery framework in the delivery of service.

== Accountability for service delivery ==
The relationship between government and citizens is crucial. Ultimately, government is accountable to citizens for decisions taken. Many countries need to improve the substantive elements of democracy and its checks and balances to ensure that public goods are delivered according to citizens’ expectations. Some methodologies for assessing the extent to which service delivery is accountable have been developed. For instance, the methodology for citizen-led assessment of accountability in service delivery has been developed by the International IDEA.

== See also ==
- Service delivery platform
- Servicescape
