= OneAPI (GSM telecom) =

OneAPI is a set of application programming interfaces (APIs) supported by the GSM Association that exposes network capabilities over the Internet.

OneAPI, as defined by the telecom industry—led by GSMA and the Open Mobile Alliance (OMA)—is a set of standardized and lightweight Web-friendly application programming interfaces (API) for communications service providers (CSPs) to use to expose their networks. Building on OneAPI version 2.0 specifications, the current OneAPI specifications are at version 3 beta (published from February to April 2012).

Any mobile operator or service provider is able to implement and use OneAPI. OneAPI is intended to complement existing client-side and Web APIs and not replace it, by providing access to network capabilities and information, regardless of operator.

== It supersedes Parlay X APIs ==
OneAPI differs from Parlay X in that the network capabilities are exposed in a RESTful fashion, with JSON responses, to facilitate mash-ups with Web APIs. Also the number of functions has been reduced to keep things simple.

Vodafone has sponsored and led the GSMA OneAPI project since its inception in 2008.

=== OneAPI v1.0 ===
- Payments - the ability to charge the user's bill (or pre-pay credits) for downloads and in-app micropayments. The API allows a direct charge, pending user authorization, or the ability to first reserve funds and then charge later (for example, when you are satisfied that they have received the item paid for). You may check the receipt of a particular transaction, and refund a user fully or partially for a previous transaction.
- Location - locate one or more users to the requested accuracy. The operator will aim to respond as close to the requested accuracy as possible.
- Messaging - the ability to send a SMS/MMS to a user, or a batch of users; and also the ability to have users send SMS or MMS to your Web application.

=== OneAPI v2.0 ===
- Data Connection Profile - lookup the network, bearer and roaming status of a particular terminal
- Device Capability Profile - determine the make/model of device and a link to its UA Prof (or similar) description
- Call control - set up and manage calls between two or more parties, including a Web IVR application and a user

User authorisation is handled via an OAuth flow. This makes OneAPI compatible with many Web services (Facebook, Twitter, Google) that support OAuth, and it ensures that users are in consent that their private info can be shared with web applications.
