= Building consent authority =

Building consent authorities (BCAs) are officials who enforce New Zealand's regulatory building control system. The New Zealand Building Act 2004 sets out a registration and accreditation scheme and technical reviews. The Act creates operational roles for BCAs.

== Authorities ==
The following are the approved building consent authorities listed on the MBIE Register: Note that the register lists 80 BCAs but some of these are former territorial authorities that have been amalgamated into Auckland Council (such as Franklin District Council and North Shore City Council). Building consents on the Chatham Islands are contracted out to Wellington City Council and large dams on the Chatham's to Environment Canterbury. In addition to the regional and territorial authorities, Housing New Zealand made a decision in 2019 to establish Consentium, a national BCA in Kāinga Ora, that is responsible for building consents for public housing (up to and including four storeys) across New Zealand that Kāinga Ora intends to retain. Consentium achieved Accreditation in November 2020 and Registration in March 2021.

1. Ashburton District Council
2. Auckland Council
3. Banks Peninsula District Council
4. Buller District Council
5. Carterton District Council
6. Central Hawkes Bay District Council
7. Central Otago District Council
8. Christchurch City Council
9. Clutha District Council
10. Consentium, a division of Kāinga Ora
11. Dunedin City Council
12. Environment Canterbury
13. Environment Waikato
14. Far North District Council
15. Gisborne District Council
16. Gore District Council
17. Grey District Council
18. Hamilton City Council
19. Hastings District Council
20. Hauraki District Council
21. Horowhenua District Council
22. Hurunui District Council
23. Hutt City Council
24. Invercargill City Council
25. Kaikōura District Council
26. Kaipara District Council
27. Kapiti Coast District Council
28. Kawerau District Council
29. MacKenzie District Council
30. Manawatu District Council
31. Marlborough District Council
32. Masterton District Council
33. Matamata-Piako District Council
34. Napier City Council
35. Nelson City Council
36. New Plymouth District Council
37. Northland District Council
38. Opotiki District Council
39. Otago Regional Council
40. Otorohanga District Council
41. Palmerston North City Council
42. Porirua City Council
43. Queenstown Lakes District Council
44. Rangitikei District Council
45. Rotorua District Council
46. Ruapehu District Council
47. Selwyn District Council
48. South Taranaki District Council
49. South Waikato District Council
50. South Wairarapa District Council
51. Southland District Council
52. Stratford District Council
53. Tararua District Council
54. Tasman District Council
55. Taupo District Council
56. Tauranga City Council
57. Thames-Coromandel District Council
58. Timaru District Council
59. Upper Hutt City Council
60. Waikato District Council
61. Waikato Regional Council
62. Waimakariri District Council
63. Waimate District Council
64. Waipa District Council
65. Wairoa District Council
66. Waitaki District Council
67. Waitomo District Council
68. Wellington City Council
69. Western Bay of Plenty District Council
70. Westland District Council
71. Whakatane District Council
72. Whanganui District Council
73. Whangarei District Council
