= New Zealand Local Government =

- Editor: Natasha Jojoa Burling
- Categories: Local government in New Zealand
- Frequency: Monthly
- Publisher: Contrafed Publishing
- Founded: 1964
- Company: Contrafed Publishing
- Country: New Zealand
- Based in: Auckland
- Website: localgovernmentmag.co.nz
- ISSN: 0028-8403

NZ Local Government Magazine is a monthly title published by Contrafed Publishing, an Auckland-based company. It was first published in 1964. Contrafed Publishing, which also publishes Contractor, Energy NZ, Quarrying and Mining, purchased the publication from Mediaweb in 2014.

== Content ==
The magazine "provides independent news and feature coverage of the entire local government sector", and it covers topics including "governance, finance and rates, engineering, coastal management, conferences, training and recruitment." According to its website "each issue includes a digest of news reports and personnel changes throughout the country, expert opinions on legislation and legal decisions affecting the sector, as well as feature articles covering the issues of the moment."
