= Hierarchical internetworking model =

Computer network design model

The Hierarchical internetworking model is a three-layer model for network design first proposed by Cisco in 1998. The hierarchical design model divides enterprise networks into three layers: core, distribution, and access.

== Access layer ==
End-stations and servers connect to the enterprise at the access layer. Access layer devices are usually commodity switching platforms, and may or may not provide layer 3 switching services. The traditional focus at the access layer is minimizing "cost-per-port": the amount of investment the enterprise must make for each provisioned Ethernet port. This layer is also called the desktop layer because it focuses on connecting client nodes, such as workstations to the network.

== Distribution layer ==
The distribution layer is the smart layer in the three-layer model. Routing, filtering, and QoS policies are managed at the distribution layer. Distribution layer devices also often manage individual branch-office WAN connections. This layer is also called the Workgroup layer.

== Core layer ==
The core layer is the backbone of a network, where the internet(internetwork) gateways are located. The core network provides high-speed, highly redundant forwarding services to move packets between distribution-layer devices in different regions of the network. Core switches and routers are usually the most powerful, in terms of raw forwarding power, in the enterprise; core network devices manage the highest-speed connections, such as 10 Gigabit Ethernet or 100 Gigabit Ethernet.

== See also ==
- Service layer
- "Hierarchical Network Design", Connecting Networks Companion Guide, Cisco Press, 2014 PDF
- Khalid Raza, Mark Turner (1998), "Chapter 4. Network Topology and Design", Large-Scale IP Network Solutions, Cisco Press, ISBN 978-1-57870-084-4
- High Availability Campus Network Design, Cisco, 2008 PDF
