= Telephony application server =

The term telephony application server refers to an entity in a telephone network that carries out functions that are not directly related to the routing of messages through the network.

Such functions can include in-network answering machines, 800 (freephone) numbers, automatic call forwarding, conference bridges and many other types of application. In integrated telephone networks, these are mostly implemented as functions in the telephone exchange, but in more open networks such as IP telephony networks based on the SIP protocol, these are often separate computers.

In contexts where it is obvious that one is talking about telephony, such as RFC 3057, one often just calls them "application servers"; this is also common in the context of SIP (for instance in RFC 4240), because proponents argue that SIP is applicable to a much wider range of applications than just telephony.

The application server provides call-termination or subscriber-independent applications. These include such capabilities as local number portability, free-call routing resolution, conference bridge services, and unified messaging. The PSTN versions of these applications are frequently known as 800 numbers in North America. The subscriber has to explicitly place a call to the application server.

Application server applications are of two general types, those that are signaling only, and those that involve media manipulation. The former are often related to routing resolution—local number portability, free-call routing, and other services where the dialed number must be translated to a routable address. An example involving media manipulation would be conference bridge applications, something with which most business people are very familiar. The call steps include

- Each user calls in on a pre-published number.
- The dialed number is translated into an IP address and named the endpoint of the application server, and the call is routed there.
- The application server connects to the media server, instructing it to play a greeting and collect the conference number.
- The media server returns and conference number, and the application server instructs the media server to play a prompt to collect the authorization number.
- If the digits collected are correct, the application server tells the media server to move this call to a particular conference bridge.
