= Service control point =

A service control point (SCP) is a standard component of the Intelligent Network (IN) telephone system which is used to control the service. Standard SCPs in the telecom industry today are deployed using SS7, SIGTRAN or SIP technologies. The SCP queries the service data point (SDP) which holds the actual database and directory. SCP, using the database from the SDP, identifies the geographical number to which the call is to be routed. This is the same mechanism that is used to route 800 numbers.

SCP may also communicate with an intelligent peripheral (IP) to play voice messages, or prompt for information from the user, such as prepaid long distance using account codes. This is done by implementing telephone feature codes like "#", which can be used to terminate the input for a user name or password or can be used for call forwarding. These are realized using Intelligent Network Application Part (INAP) that sits above Transaction Capabilities Application Part (TCAP) on the SS7 protocol stack. The TCAP is part of the top or 7th layer of the OSI layer breakdown.

SCPs are connected with either SSPs or STPs. This is dependent upon the network architecture that the network service provider wants. The most common implementation uses STPs.

SCP and SDP split is becoming a common industry practice. This is known generally in the industry by split architecture. Reason is that operators want to decouple the dependency between the two functionality to facilitate upgrades and possibly rely on different vendors.
