= Service switching point =

In telephony, a service switching point (SSP) is the telephone exchange that initially responds, when a telephone caller dials a number, by sending a query to a central database called a service control point (SCP) so that the call can be handled. The service switching point uses the Signalling System No. 7 (SS7) protocols which are responsible for the call setup, management, and termination with other service switching points.

== Relationship between SSP and SCP ==
With the introduction of the Intelligent Network architecture, service functionality (e.g. UK translation of 0800 non-geographic telephone numbers) is being removed from the actual telephone exchange and devolved out into other computer nodes. In this new architecture, the telephone exchange is known as an SSP and the node that contains the services (and hence controls the progression of a call) is known as service control point (SCP).

== Example of a 0800 number translation service ==
In the UK 08XXX numbers are non-geographic numbers – that is, the number does not refer to a telephone number in any particular region of the UK. To route a call to such an 08XXX number, the number must be translated into a geographic number (e.g. 0121 XXX XXXX for Birmingham numbers).

An SSP telephone exchange receives a call to an 0800 number. This causes a trigger within the SSP that causes an SCP (Service Control Point) to be queried using SS7 protocols (INAP, TCAP). The SCP responds with a geographic number, e.g. 0121 XXX XXXX, and the call is actually routed to a phone.

By this architecture:

- 08XXX (non-geographic numbers) can be set up in a few SCP nodes rather than having to be set up in every telephone exchange in the country.
- geographic numbers can be hidden
- revenue can be generated by non-telecoms companies from people making telephone calls to services – e.g. telephone voting
