= Parlay X =

Set of standard Web service APIs for the telephone network

Parlay X was a set of standard Web service APIs for the telephone network (fixed and mobile). It is defunct and now replaced by OneAPI, which is the current valid standard from the GSM association for Telecom third party API.

It enables software developers to use the capabilities of an underlying network. The APIs are deliberately high level abstractions and designed to be simple to use. An application developer can, for example, invoke a single Web Service request to get the location of a mobile device or initiate a telephone call.

The Parlay X Web services are defined jointly by ETSI, the Parlay Group, and the Third Generation Partnership Project (3GPP). OMA has done the maintenance of the specifications for 3GPP release 8.

The APIs are defined using Web Service technology: interfaces are defined using WSDL 1.1 and conform with Web Services Interoperability (WS-I Basic Profile).

The APIs are published as a set of specifications.

| Parlay X 4.0 Specification | Available functionality |
|---|---|
| Part 1: "Common" | Definitions re-used across multiple Parlay X specifications |
| Part 2: "Third Party Call" | Creating and managing a call initiated by an application |
| Part 3: "Call Notification" | Handling calls initiated by a subscriber in the network. One variant (i.e. application interface) allows application to "direct" the handling of the call and the other simply provides a notification. |
| Part 4: "Short Messaging" | Receive and send SMS (including delivery receipts) |
| Part 5: "Multimedia Messaging" | Receive and send Multimedia Messages |
| Part 6: "Payment" | Payment reservations, pre-paid payments, and post-paid payments |
| Part 7: "Account Management" | Account querying, direct recharging and recharging through vouchers |
| Part 8: "Terminal Status" | Get the status (i.e. reachable, unreachable or busy) of a terminal |
| Part 9: "Terminal Location" | Getting location information about a terminal |
| Part 10: "Call Handling" | Specify how calls are to be handled for a specific number. There is no 'per-call interaction' with the application unlike in the Call Notification API. |
| Part 11: "Audio Call" | Provide multimedia message delivery and the dynamic management of the media involved for the call participants |
| Part 12: "Multimedia Conference" | Create a multimedia conference and the dynamic management of the participants involved |
| Part 13: "Address List Management" | Manage groups (aliases) of subscribers |
| Part 14: "Presence" | Presence information to be obtained about or registered for users used e.g. by Instance Messaging clients |
| Part 15: “Message Broadcast” | Send messages to all the fixed or mobile terminals in a specified geographical area |
| Part 16: “Geocoding” | Get the location address of a subscriber e.g. country, state, district, city, street, house number, additional information, and zip/postal code |
| Part 17: “Application-driven Quality of Service (QoS)” | Dynamically change the quality of service (e.g. bandwidth) available on end user network connection |
| Part 18: "Device Capabilities and Configuration" | Get information about device capabilities and push device configuration to a device |
| Part 19: “Multimedia Streaming Control” | Control streaming of multimedia to a subscriber e.g. to transfer stream between a user's terminals |
| Part 20: “Multimedia Multicast Session Management | Control a multicast session, its members and multimedia stream, and obtain channel presence information |
| Part 21: "Content management" | The content management web service enables uploading content into the network (or a third party content provider) and consuming content from the network (or a third party content provider). |
| Part 22: "Policy" | The Policy Web Service is defined to offer provisioning and evaluation functions for policies. |

In general Parlay X provides an abstraction of functionality exposed by the more complex, but functionally richer Parlay APIs. ETSI provide a set of (informative not normative) Parlay X to Parlay mapping documents.

Parlay X services have been rolled out by a number of telecom operators, including BT, Korea Telecom, T-Com, Mobilekom and Sprint.
