= Service-oriented =

Service-oriented may refer to:

- Service-orientation, in business computing
- Service-oriented architecture (SOA), related to the above meaning
- Service-oriented development of applications (SODA), a way of producing service-oriented architecture applications
- Service-oriented device architecture (SODA), to enable devices to be connected to a service-oriented architecture (SOA)
- Service-oriented distributed applications, an architecture that allows some services to be run on the client and some on the server
- Service-oriented infrastructure (SOI), a system for describing information technology infrastructure as a service
- Service-oriented modeling, a discipline of modeling business and software systems
- Service-oriented provisioning (SOP), a technology concept pertaining to Wireless Internet service provider (WISP) and ISP space
- Service-oriented software engineering (SOSE), a software engineering methodology focused on the composition of reusable components
- Service-oriented transformation, the successor to classic business transformation initiatives
- Service-oriented (sexuality), in human sexuality
