= Sessa =

Sessa may refer to:

== Places ==
- Sessa, Ticino, a municipality in Ticino, Switzerland
- Sessa, Angola, a town and commune in the province of Moxico
- Sessa Aurunca, a town in the province of Caserta, Campania, Italy
  - Roman Catholic Diocese of Sessa Aurunca
- Sessa Cilento, a town in the province of Salerno, Campania, Italy
- Sessa railway station, Sonitpur district, Assam, India

== People ==
- Duke of Sessa, Spanish nobility
- Carmine Sessa, American 1990s mobster
- Dominic Sessa, American actor
- Gastón Sessa (born 1973), Argentine footballer
- Karl Borromäus Alexander Sessa (1786–1813), German playwright
- Sissa (mythical brahmin), legendary Indian inventor of chess

== See also ==
- Sissa (disambiguation)
