= Service description =

In information technology, a service description is a description of a service that explains how the service can be used by clients. The exact meaning of the term depends on context.

== In IT service management ==
In IT service management, a service is something provided by people to other people.

Certain frameworks to describe IT service management use the term service description; for instance, it may be a standard part of a service level agreement.

== In software systems ==
In software systems with a service-oriented architecture, certain parts of the software act as services that other parts of the software invoke by sending a request and receiving a response in return. Many different ways of doing this have been developed over time; some have developed into standards, such as CORBA and SOAP. In this context, a service description describes the structure of the request and of the response. The exact way to do this depends on the standard being used. Examples:

- Interface description language – Computer language used to describe a software component's interface
- Web Services Description Language – XML-based interface description language
- RESTful Service Description Language – XML description of HTTP-based web APIs
- SOAP Service Description Language – Messaging protocol for web services
- Service Mapping Description – Proposed standard for describing web services available at a particular endpoint using JSON
