= Sose =

Sose, SOSE or SoSE may refer to:

== Acronyms ==
- Service-oriented software engineering, a software engineering methodology
- System of systems engineering (SoSE), a methodology
- Sins of a Solar Empire (SoSE), a 2008 real-time strategy 4X video game

== People ==
- Sose Mayrig (1868–1953), Armenian fedayee
- Sosé Onasakenrat (1845–1881), Mohawk chief

== Other uses ==
- Sose International Film Festival, held in Yerevan, Armenia, since 2014
- Sose (mythology), various characters in Greek myth
