= Service engineering =

Service engineering may refer to:

- Building services engineering
- Service-oriented software engineering
