= Sissa =

Sissa may refer to:

== People ==
- Giulia Sissa (born 1954), Italian classical scholar and historian of philosophy
- Sissa (mythical brahmin), legendary Indian inventor of chess

== Places ==
- Sissa Trecasali, a comune in Parma, Emilia-Romagna, Italy
  - Sissa, Sissa Trecasali, a frazione
- Sissa River, Flores, East Nusa Tenggara, Indonesia

== Other ==
- SISSA (International School for Advanced Studies), Trieste, Italy

== See also ==
- Sessa (disambiguation)
