= Service-oriented infrastructure =

Service Oriented Infrastructure or SOI provides a system for describing information technology (IT) infrastructure as a service. The underlying principles go back to, among others, Mainframe and LDAP technologies; SOI provides a framework or mindset for making business benefits measurable.

== Overview ==
A service-oriented infrastructure provides a foundation for IT services. A concept initially developed by Intel discussed three domains for service-orientation:

1. the enterprise
2. the application architecture
3. the infrastructure

This article covers the infrastructure domain of service-orientation. Key aspects of service-oriented infrastructure include industrialisation and virtualisation, providing IT infrastructure services via a pool of resources (web servers, application servers, database servers, servers, storage instances) instead of through discrete instances.

While the IT industry has widely adopted service-oriented architecture (SOA), service-oriented infrastructure or SOI has lagged in its adoption. This has changed with the availability of SOI solutions like application-server grids, database grids, Virtualised servers and virtualised storage.

A joint effort between HP, Cisco and Capgemini has resulted in the following definition for a service-oriented infrastructure:

- a virtualised IT infrastructure with components managed in an industrialised way and which:
  - expose a catalog of services instead of discrete instances
  - can comprise service-oriented architecture application support

The term SOI also has a broader usage, which includes all configurable infrastructure resources such as compute, storage, and networking hardware and software to support the running of applications. Consistent with the objectives for SOA, SOI facilitates the reuse and dynamic allocation of necessary infrastructure resources. The development of SOI solutions focuses around the service characteristics envisaged. The service characteristics provide the basis both for the development as well as for the delivery of the services. The notion of a fully managed life cycle of the services envisages a continuum that contrasts with the event-based deployment of IT infrastructure that provided discrete silos of IT infrastructure for specific applications.

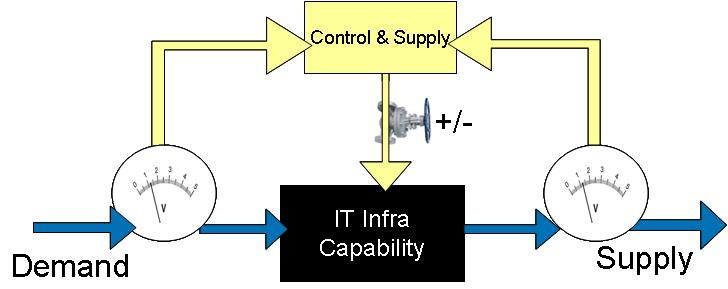

A SOI exposes a set of fundamental services such as mobility or security which form a part of the network environment that can deliver resource sharing, application integration, and communications and collaboration: ubiquitously, scalably, reliably, sustainably, maintainably and cost-effectively. In order to ensure each service provides a standard response to a standard invocation at all times, the service must include a control process. The control process measures both the demand and the supply of a capability and automatically updates the capability if required.

In April 2007 The Open Group started a project on SOI within its SOA Working Group. This SOI project aims to develop more common understanding around SOI between the members of The Open Group.

== Orchestrating virtualised components ==
Service orientation provides significant advantages for IT infrastructure services. The main benefits include increased utilisation of individual resources (meaning lower total cost of ownership) and increased service-levels as applications do not depend on the availability of any individual resource, but may use any one resource available in the pool.

As of 2009, available IT infrastructure technologies provide a full stack of options to deliver an end-to-end service-oriented service. Schedulers can virtualise each service within this domain, and a highly automated provisioning process can manage the required number of resources constituting a service, thus ensuring standard quality and consistent behaviour of the infrastructure services. This applies to servers, storage, networks, directory services, databases: in fact to every component of the IT infrastructure.

== See also ==
- Service Oriented Architecture
- Grid computing
- Amazon Web Services
