= Michael B. T. Bell =

Software architect

Michael B.T. Bell
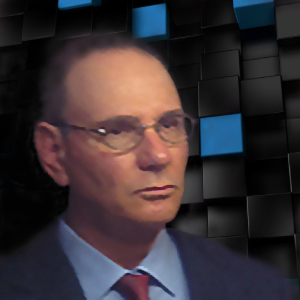
- Other name: Mickey Bell
- Education: City University of New York
- Occupations: Novelist, Artist, Producer, Enterprise Architect

Michael B.T. Bell is an American novelist, artist, producer, and enterprise software architect, chiefly recognized for developing the Incremental Software Architecture methodology, service-oriented modeling framework (SOMF), multidimensional software architecture construction (MSAC), and the cloud computing modeling notation (CCMN). His innovative research and publications in the fields of software architecture, artificial intelligence, Machine learning, service-oriented architecture, Microservices, model-driven engineering, cloud computing, cybersecurity, and big data are recognized internationally for their contribution to the software design and development communities.

== Biography ==
Bell earned his computer science master's degree from the City University of New York (CUNY).

After graduation, as a software developer and enterprise architect consultant, he dedicated his career to improving business and technological operations of financial institutions in Wall Street. He developed innovative software algorithms and methodologies for high-volume transactions in the financial field. This included modules for execution of trading applications, persistence methods for large volumes of data, and design of high-speed network and internet software implementations.

He has served as a consultant to Fortune 500 and leading global corporations, as well as the U.S. Government , including J.P. Morgan Chase, Citibank, UBS-Paine Webber, Deutsche Bank, American Express, TD Waterhouse, Pfizer, AIG, and Prudential.

== Multidimensional Software Architecture Construction ==
The multidimensional software architecture construction (MSAC) methodology is featured in Mr. bell's Software Architect book published in 2023 by Wiley (publisher). The Software Architect Toolbox section of the book elaborates on two chief views of the MSAC:
1) A quantum software architecture geometrical and topological ecosystem that applications and systems are deployed to
2) Fundamental of 3D software design.

=== Quantum Software Architecture Ecosystem ===
The multidimensional software architecture construction (MSAC) introduces an ever-evolving quantum production environment, a Topological space that is subject to geometrical structural modifications during run time and/or design-time.
These changes to the fabric's three-dimensional space of the deployment ecosystem are due to the evolution of architectural environment attributes and the unpredictable behavior of software implementations that affect the production landscape as a whole.
The animated image below depicts a dynamic production environment that hosts software entities and the dents they imprint on its space's fabric.

Multidimensional Software Architecture Construction (MSAC) Ecosystem

=== Three-Dimensional Software Implementations in an MSAC Ecosystem ===
Each software implementation, such a software application, service, or system deployed to an MSAC geometrical and topological ecosystem, is represented by three dimensions: width/breadth, length/depth, and height (as illustrated in the below animated image.)

3D Software Dimensions in a Multidimensional Software Architecture Environment

This 3D implementation model is devised to increase the level of software design specificity needed for construction, deployment, integration, and sustainment in production landscapes. The MSAC methodology is introduced to view and design 3D software constructions in any space, here on earth, any continent, region, or state, and even software deployed to space or other planets.

Each of these software dimensions specifies unique architecture structural attributes in a coordinate system. For example:
Width: granularity, modularity, structural complexity level, source code complexity level
Length: scalability, # of consumers, # of interfaces, computing resource consumption metrics
Hight: software architecture layers, solution stack (technology stack), software architecture environment stack, business or technical capability stack

== Service-Oriented Modeling Framework ==
In 2008 Bell introduced the Service-oriented modeling framework (SOMF) to the software development community in his book Service-Oriented Modeling.

The service framework, driven by Discipline-specific modeling, was devised to encourage consolidation of software assets, reduction of systems redundancy, and acceleration of time-to-market. SOMF includes a modeling language and a life cycle methodology (see image below) suited for narrowing the gap between the business and the information technology organizations in the enterprise.

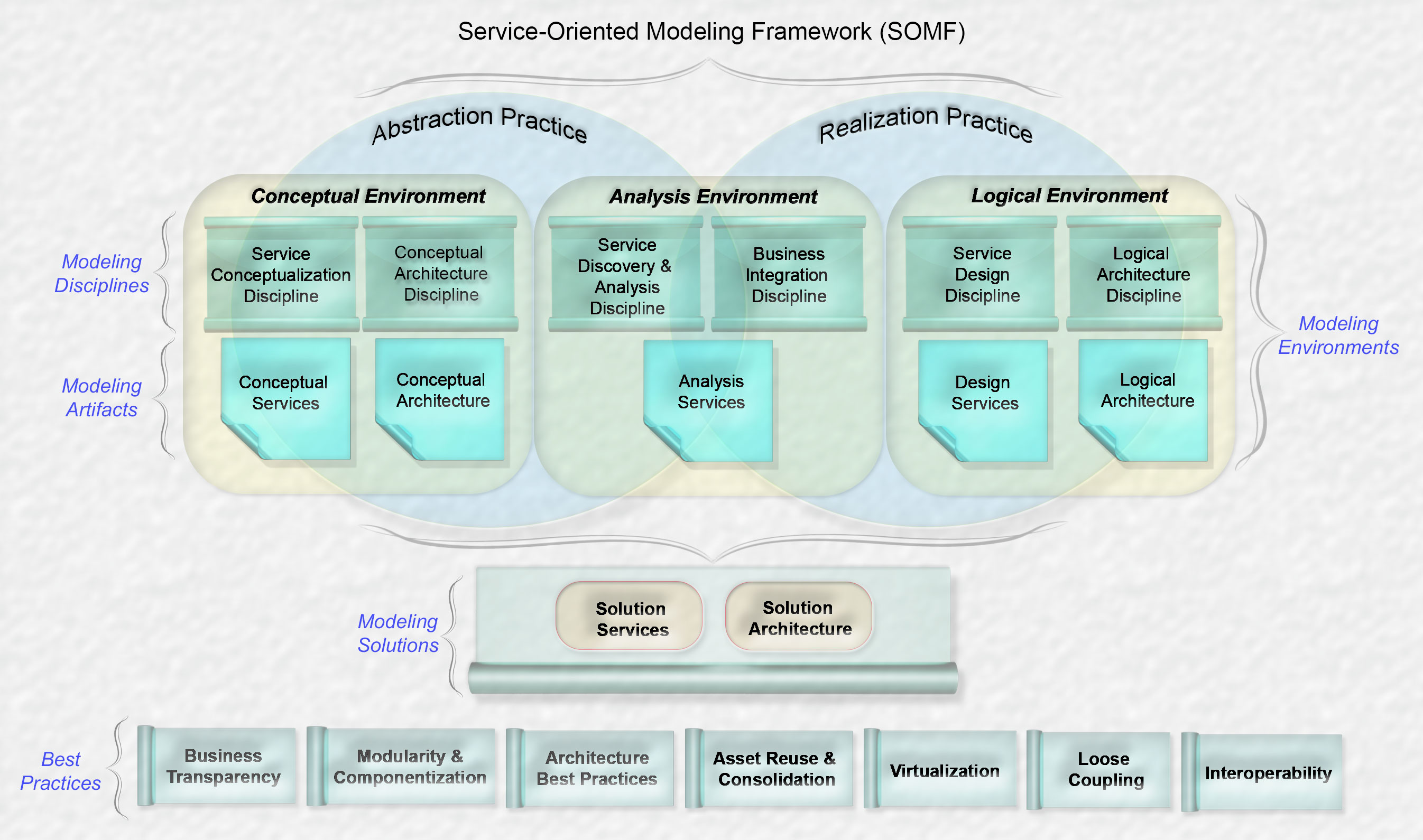
Service-Oriented Modeling Framework (SOMF)

The framework also includes modeling disciplines and practices of software systems, for the purpose of designing software applications. Furthermore, SOMF offers a variety of architectural styles, such as enterprise architecture, application architecture, service-oriented architecture, and cloud computing.

Furthermore, SOMF consists of three major segments, as illustrated through the below video clip:
Practices and Modeling Environments Segment. Overlapping Abstraction and Realization Practices with corresponding three modeling environments: Conceptual Environment, Analysis Environment, and Logical Environment.
Modeling Disciplines Segment. Each of the modeling environments contains corresponding disciplines: Conceptual Architecture Discipline, Service Discovery & Analysis Discipline, and Logical Architecture Discipline.
Artifact Segment.This part of SOMF identifies the chief artifacts required for each modeling environment.

Service-Oriented Modeling Framework (SOMF) Three Segments (while running stop to review in details)

== Incremental Software Architecture Methodology ==
Traditionally, to promote the establishment and growth of an enterprise end-state architecture, architects, typically senior IT professionals, deliver a diagram that depicts a future production landscape. In most cases, these software designers claim that such as a "to be" architecture is unbreakable and could sustain rapid market trends and complex technological evolution. Their claim also seems to assure that the illustrated architecture would operate flawlessly in production. Would it?

In many cases, though, such laid on paper architecture, is merely an academic proposition, which later fails to deliver system stability, business continuity, and superb performance. In other words, this speculative architecture tends to break down because of design flaws, and most important—lack of organizational architecture strategy.

To tackle the deployment of failing applications and systems to production and reduce the risk of harming the operating environment, Michael Bell introduced the Incremental Software Architecture approach that calls for submitting bulletproof architecture blueprints. This enterprise design should also be certified by a wide rainbow of organizational stakeholders to dodge financial calamity and business discontinuity.

How is it possible then to ensure that the illustrated design on paper would indeed render a stable production landscape? The term "stable" means that the deployed systems would meet business and non-functional requirements. The promise of the Incremental Software Architecture, therefore, is rooted in the chief principle, "First Design then Develop." But this alone is short of avoiding financial burden caused by failing implementations. Equally important, another related tenet calls for modifying the charter of development organizations: The software construction phase as we know it now, should focus on proving that architecture assumptions would certainly work in production. Bottomline, "software construction must follow the pace of design evolution." Obviously, not the other way around. The term "design evolution" means that architects should drive the product development life cycle, during which the end-state architecture could be incrementally modified, while software construction follows design alterations until architecture maturity is achieved.

To prove that an end-state architecture would indeed operate flawlessly in production, the grand enterprise design should be decomposed into sub-architectures. Such end-state architecture decomposition, therefore, would allow designers to drill down into their detail architecture and enable developers to focus on constructing architecture segments—one at a time, or some in parallel. But proving that each individual end-state architecture segment works as designed, does not mean that the entire enterprise architecture as a whole would indeed perform flawlessly. To verify if an end-state architecture is stable and could endure production environment pressures, an overall architecture stress testing should be considered to assure its stability and fitness.

Consider the Incremental Software Architecture process, as depicted in the provided diagram below:
1. End-State Architecture Discovery and Analysis. Ascertaining systems and related applications in an end-state architecture proposition
2. End-State Architecture Decomposition. The decomposition process is driven by segmenting the enterprise grand design into structural, behavioral, and volatile regions, so developers can prove that these sub-architectures would indeed work in production
3. End-State Architecture Verification. Authentication tasks include design substantiation (software construction,) end-state architecture stress testing, and enterprise capacity planning.

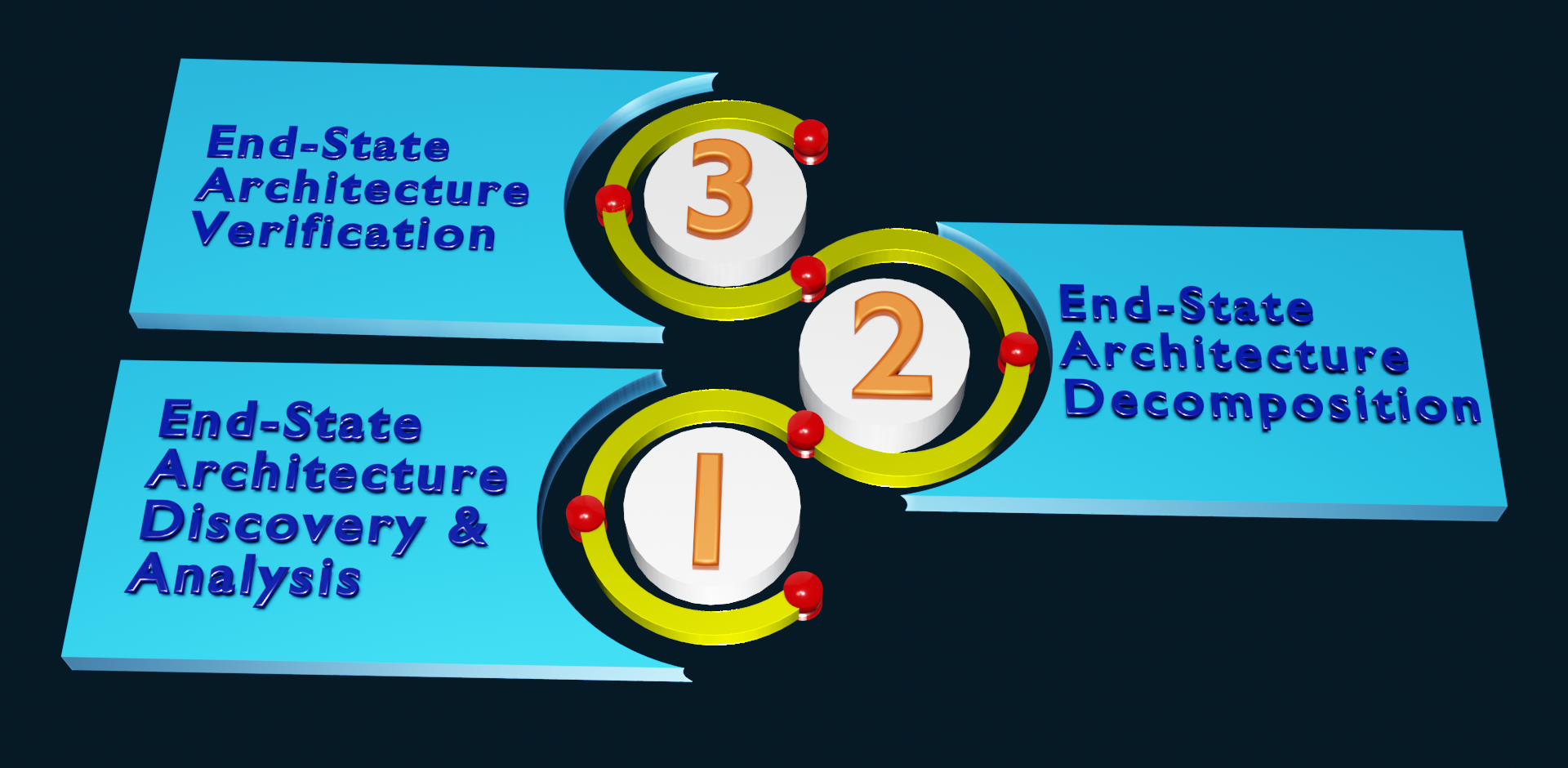
Incremental Software Architecture Process

== Publications ==
Michael Bell has published several books and articles. The following is a selection:

- 2005. "An Organizational Model: The AOM-3, Architecture Organization Structure and Role Models". IP Publishing. ISBN 978-0-9896935-3-0
- 2006. "Service-Oriented Architecture: A Planning and Implementation Guide for Business and Technology". With Eric Marks. Wiley & Sons. ISBN 978-0471768944
- 2008. "Service-Oriented Modeling: Service Analysis, Design, and Architecture". Wiley & Sons. ISBN 978-0470141113
- 2010. "SOA Modeling Patterns for Service Oriented Discovery and Analysis". Wiley & Sons. ISBN 978-0470481974
- 2011. Service Oriented Modeling Specifications for SOMF. Includes Service design and cloud computing.
- 2016. "Incremental Software Architecture: A Method for Saving Failing IT Implementations" . Wiley & Sons. ISBN 978-1119117643
- 2020. "Lost in the City of @". Michael Bell. ISBN 978-0-9896935-6-1
- 2023. "Software Architect". Michael Bell. ISBN 978-1119820970
