= SMD =

SMD or smd may refer to:

== Organizations ==
- Science Mission Directorate, a body within NASA
- Sharjah Museums Department, former name of the Sharjah Museums Authority
- Soil Machine Dynamics, an underwater vehicles company founded by Alan Reece

== Music ==
- Simian Mobile Disco, an English electronic music duo
- Slipmatt Dubs (born 1967), Breakbeat hardcore series
- Sacræ Musicæ Doctor (Doctor of Sacred Music)

== Science and technology ==
- Standardized mean difference, a basis for effect size in statistics
- Sauter mean diameter, in fluid dynamics
- Semi Metalic Disc, audio release format developed in Brazil
- Service Mapping Description, a proposed standard for describing web services
- Stereotypic movement disorder, a motor disorder
- Storage Module Device, 1970s CDC disk drives
- Surface-mounted device, an electronic component used in surface-mount technology
- SMD LED module, a common component of an LED lamp

== Other uses ==
- Sega Mega Drive, a fourth-generation video game console
- Single-member district, a type of electoral district

== Codes ==
- IATA and FAA identifier for Smith Field (Indiana) airport, Fort Wayne, Indiana, US
- National Rail station code for Stamford railway station, South Kesteven, Lincolnshire, England
