= Ambalappuzha Sree Krishna Swamy Temple =

Temple in South India

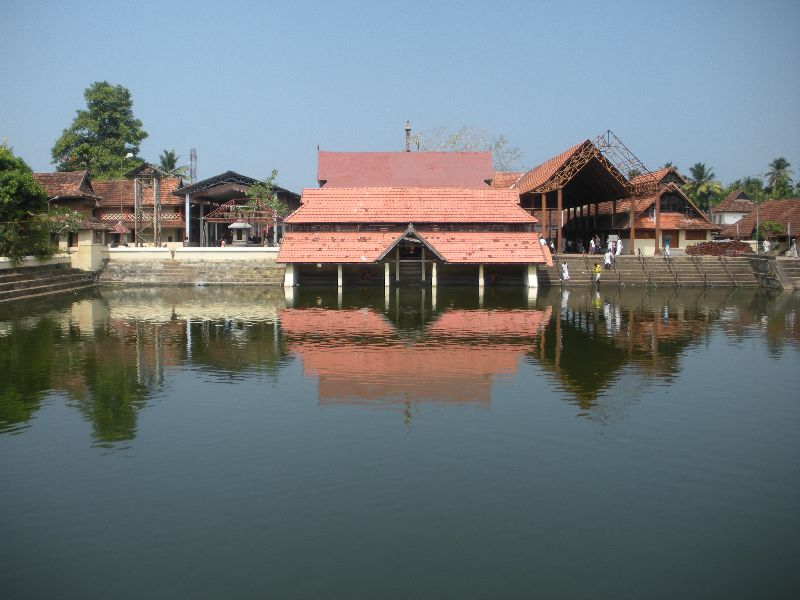

- Location within Kerala

Religion
- Affiliation: Hinduism
- Deity: Krishna

Location
- Location: Ambalappuzha
- State: Kerala
- Country: India
- Coordinates: 9.3836°N 76.3695°E

Architecture
- Creator: Chembakasserry Pooradam Thirunal-Devanarayanan Thampuran
- Completed: ME 790

Ambalappuzha Sree Krishna Swamy Temple is an Indian Hindu temple dedicated to Krishna at Ambalappuzha in Alappuzha district of Kerala. The temple is believed to have been built during 15th century CE by the local ruler Chembakasserry Pooradam Thirunal-Devanarayanan Thampuran. It is one of the seven greatest temples in Travancore. It is considered one among the 108 Abhimana Kshethram of Vaishnavate tradition.

The idol at Ambalappuzha is likened to Parthasarthi form of Vishnu, holding a whip in his right hand and a conch in his left. During the raids of Tipu Sultan in 1789, the idol of Sri Krishna from the Guruvayoor Temple was brought to the Ambalappuzha Temple for safe keeping for three years.

Payasam, a sweet pudding made of rice and milk, is served in the temple and is believed that Guruvayoorappan visits the temple daily to accept the offering.

== Legend ==
According to the legend, Krishna once appeared in the form of a sage in the court of the king who ruled the region (Chembakassery) and challenged him for a game of chess (or chaturanga). The king being a chess enthusiast himself gladly accepted the invitation. The prize had to be decided before the game and the king asked the sage to choose his prize in case he won. The sage told the king that he had a very modest claim and being a man of few material needs, all he wished was a few grains of rice. The amount of rice itself would be determined using the chess-board in the following manner: one grain of rice on the first square, two grains in the second square, four in the third square, eight in the fourth square, sixteen in fifth square, doubling up to the final, sixty-fourth square.

The king lost the game and the sage demanded the agreed-upon prize. As he started adding grains of rice to the chess board, the king soon realised the true scale of the sage's demands. The royal granary soon ran out of grains of rice. The king realised that he would never be able to fulfill the promised reward as the number of grains was increasing in a geometric progression and the total amount of rice required for a 64-square chess board was 18,446,744,073,709,551,615 grains, translating to trillions of tons of rice.

Upon seeing the dilemma, the sage appeared to the king in his true-form and told the king that he did not have to pay the debt immediately but could pay him over time. The king would serve paal-payasam (pudding made of rice) in the temple freely to the pilgrims every day until the debt was paid off.

== Festival ==
The Amabalapuzha Temple Festival was established during the fifteenth century CE. At this time, central parts of Alappuzha district were ruled by the Chembakassery Devanarayana Dynasty. The rulers of this dynasty were highly religious and decided that an idol of Krishna was to be brought to the Amabalapuzha Sree Krishna Swamy Temple from the Karinkulam temple. The celebration in commemoration of the bringing of this idol of Krishna is the origin of the Amabalapuzha Temple Festival, also referred to as the Chambakulam Moolam water festival. This festival is conducted every year on the Moolam day of the Mithunam month of the Malayalam era. The Aaraattu festival takes place on the Thiruvonam day in March–April.

== Gallery ==
Views of the temple
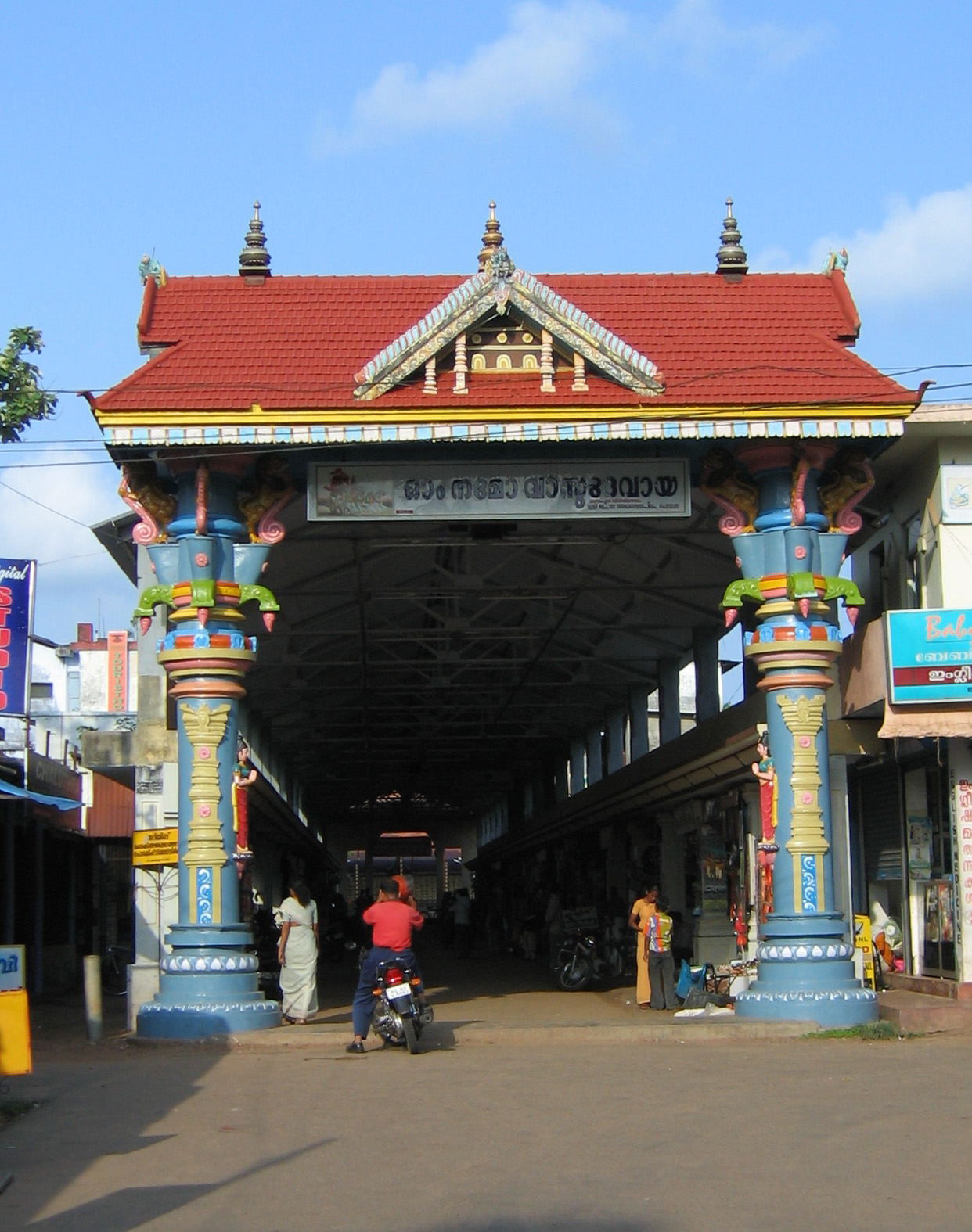
Outer entrance of temple

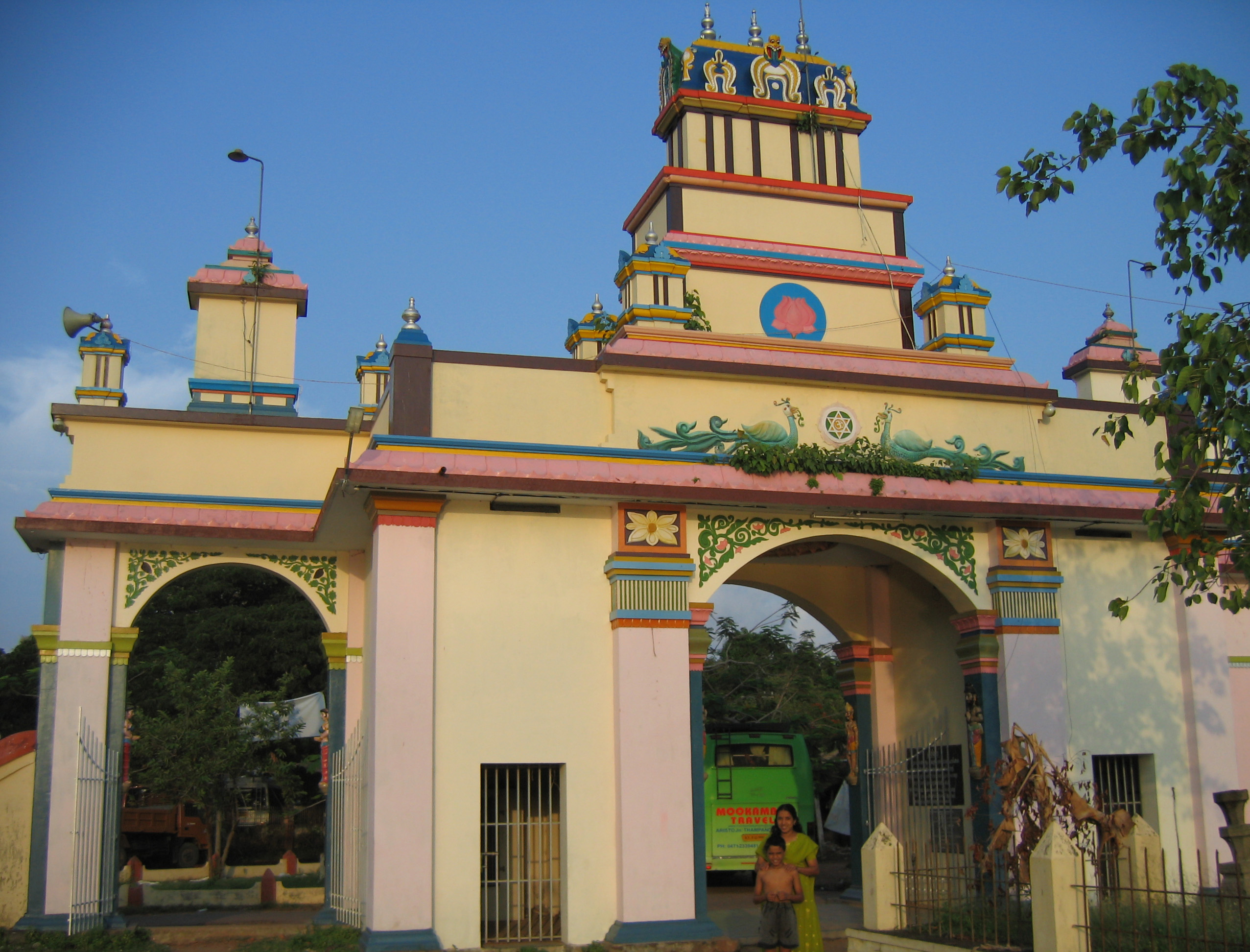
Inside view

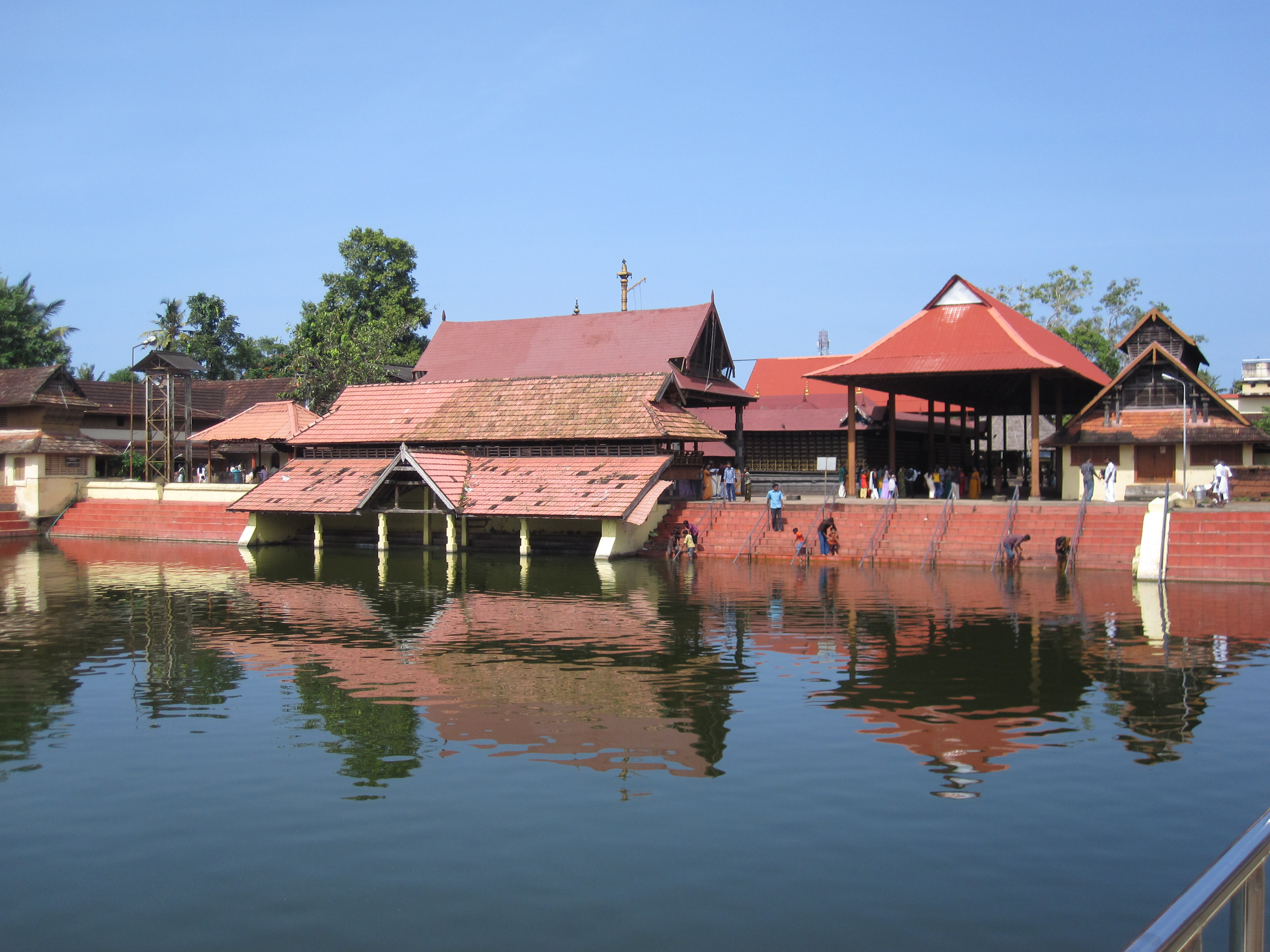
Temple stepwell

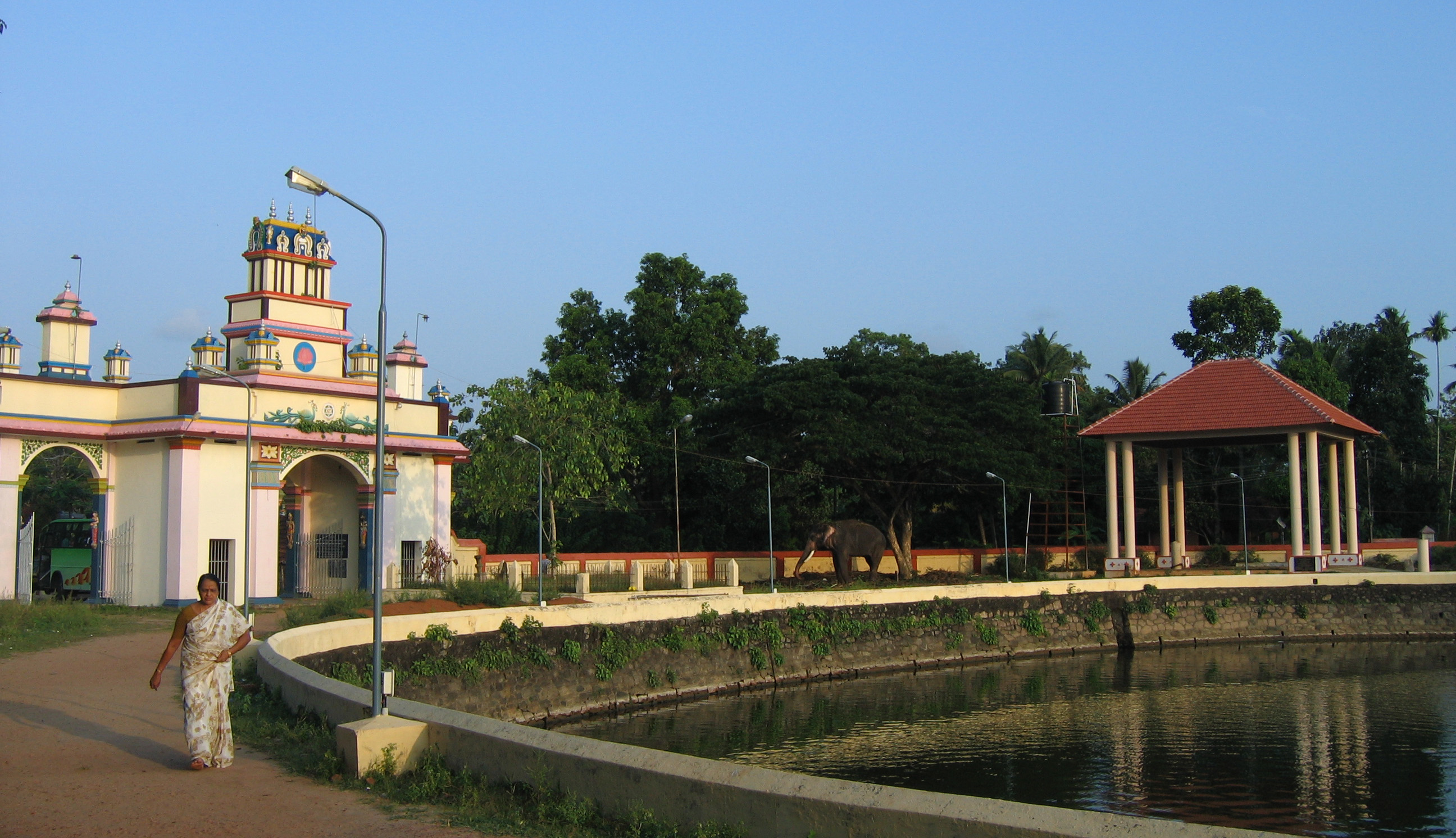
Temple and stepwell

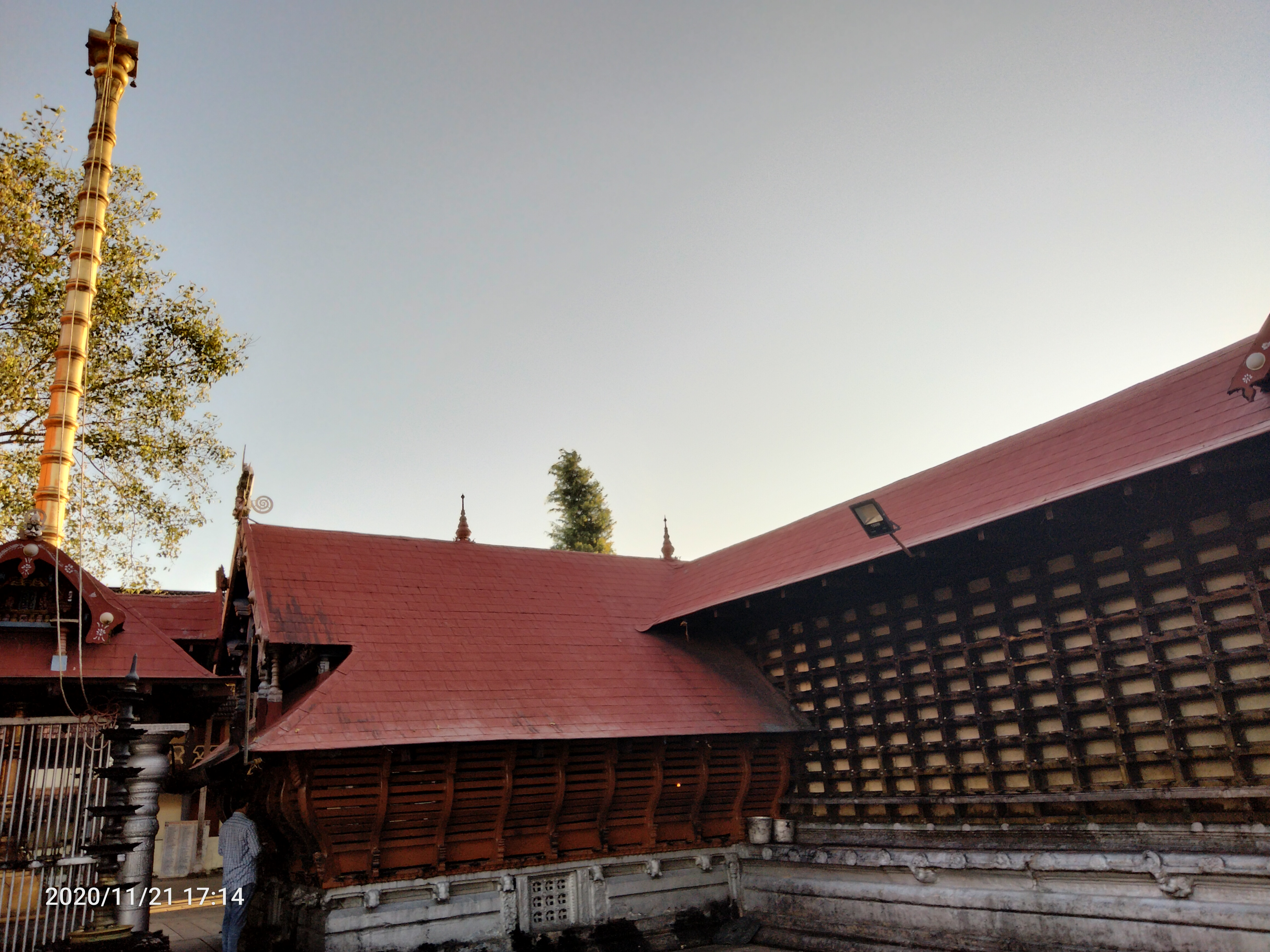
Ambalappuzha Sree Krishna Temple

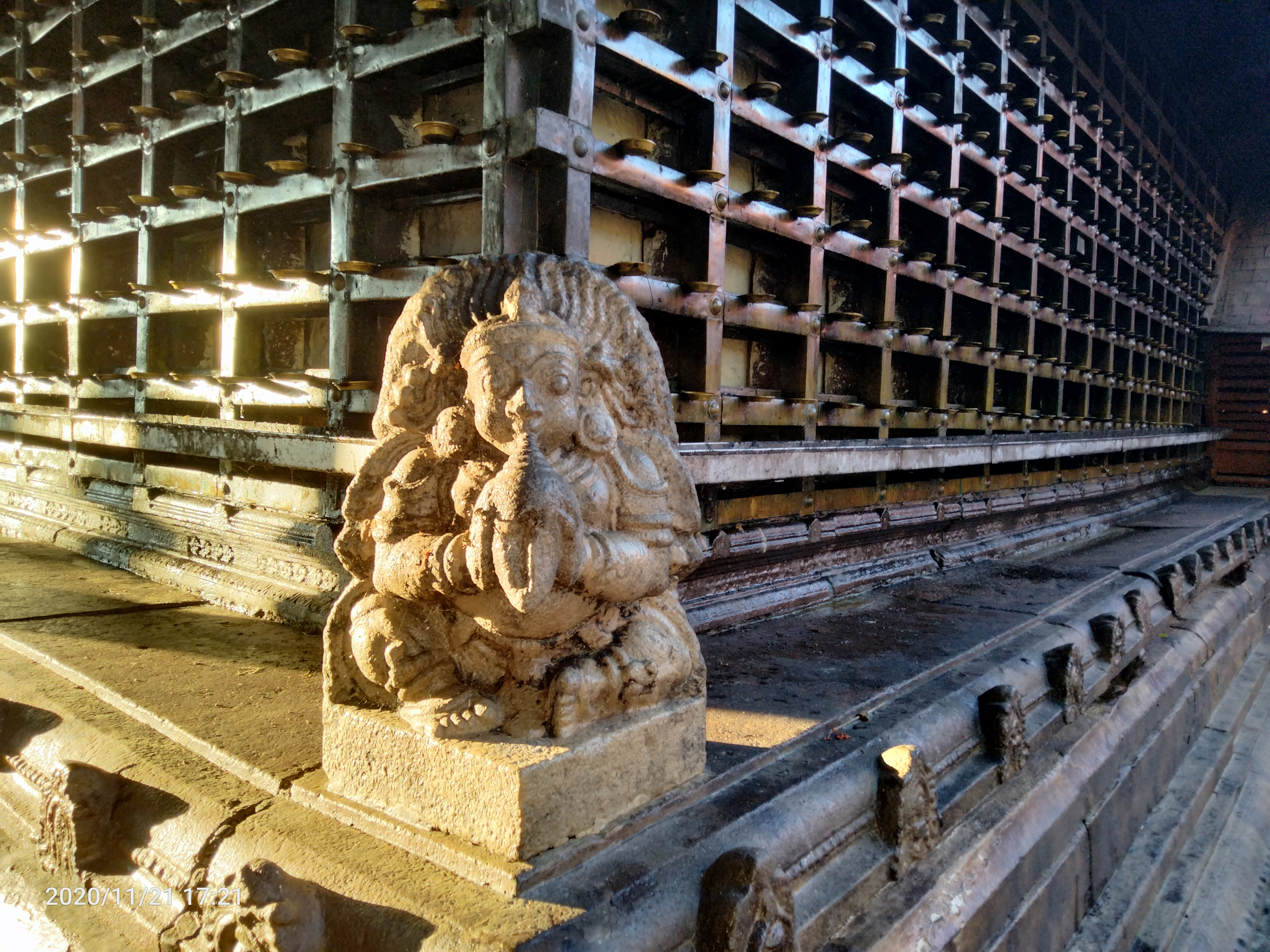
Ambalappuzha Sree Krishna Temple Chuttuvilakku

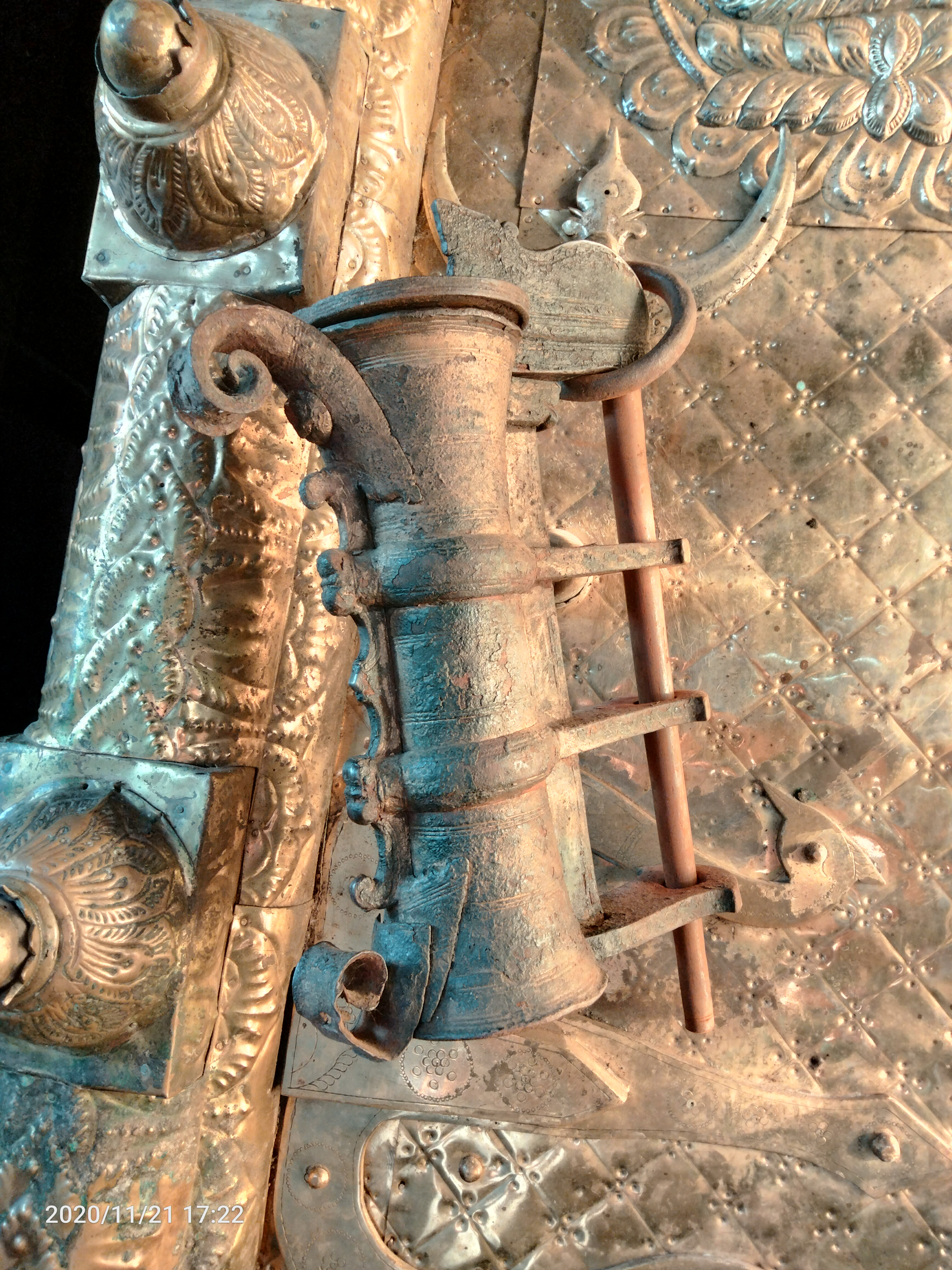
Temple Lock

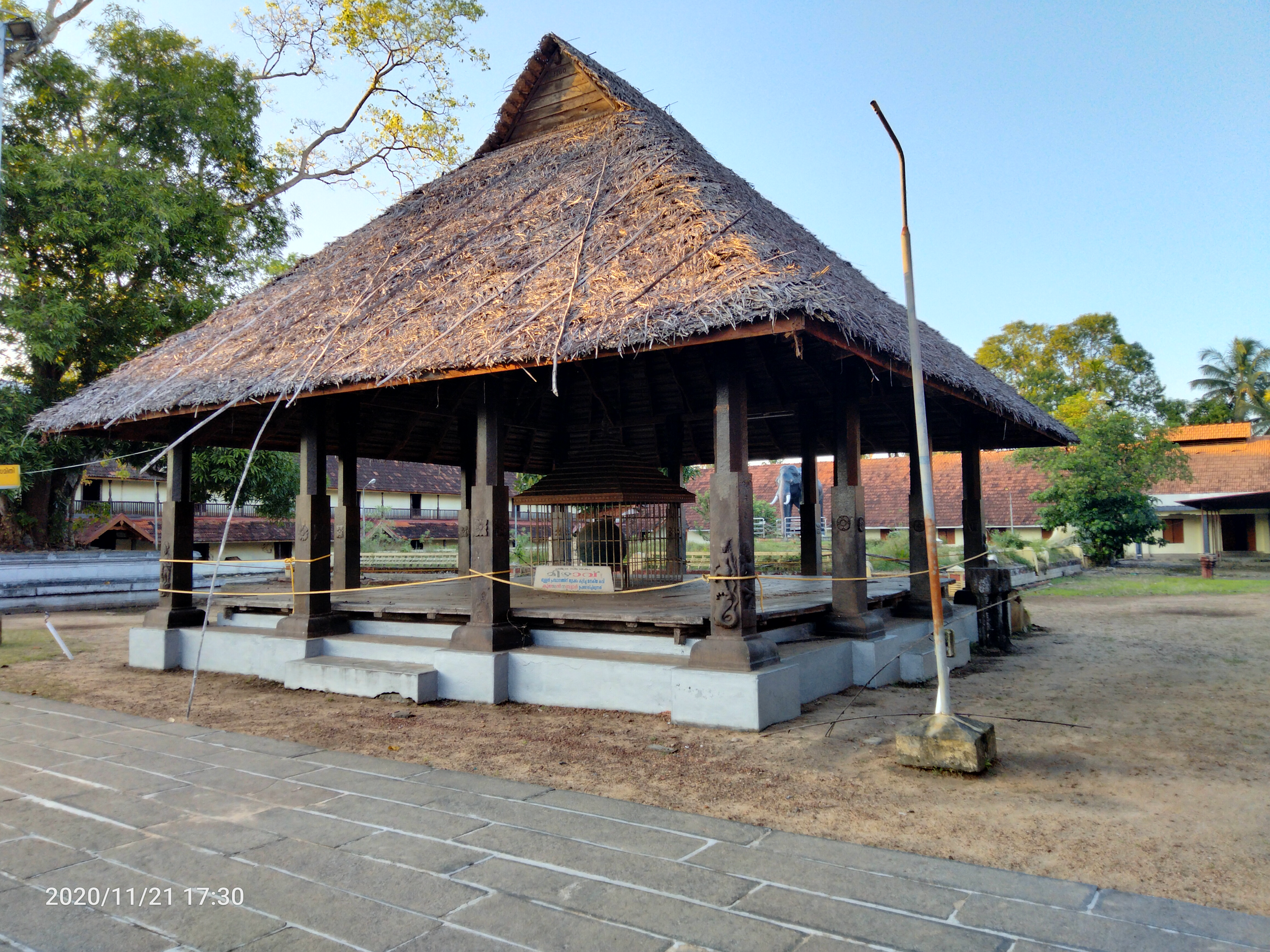

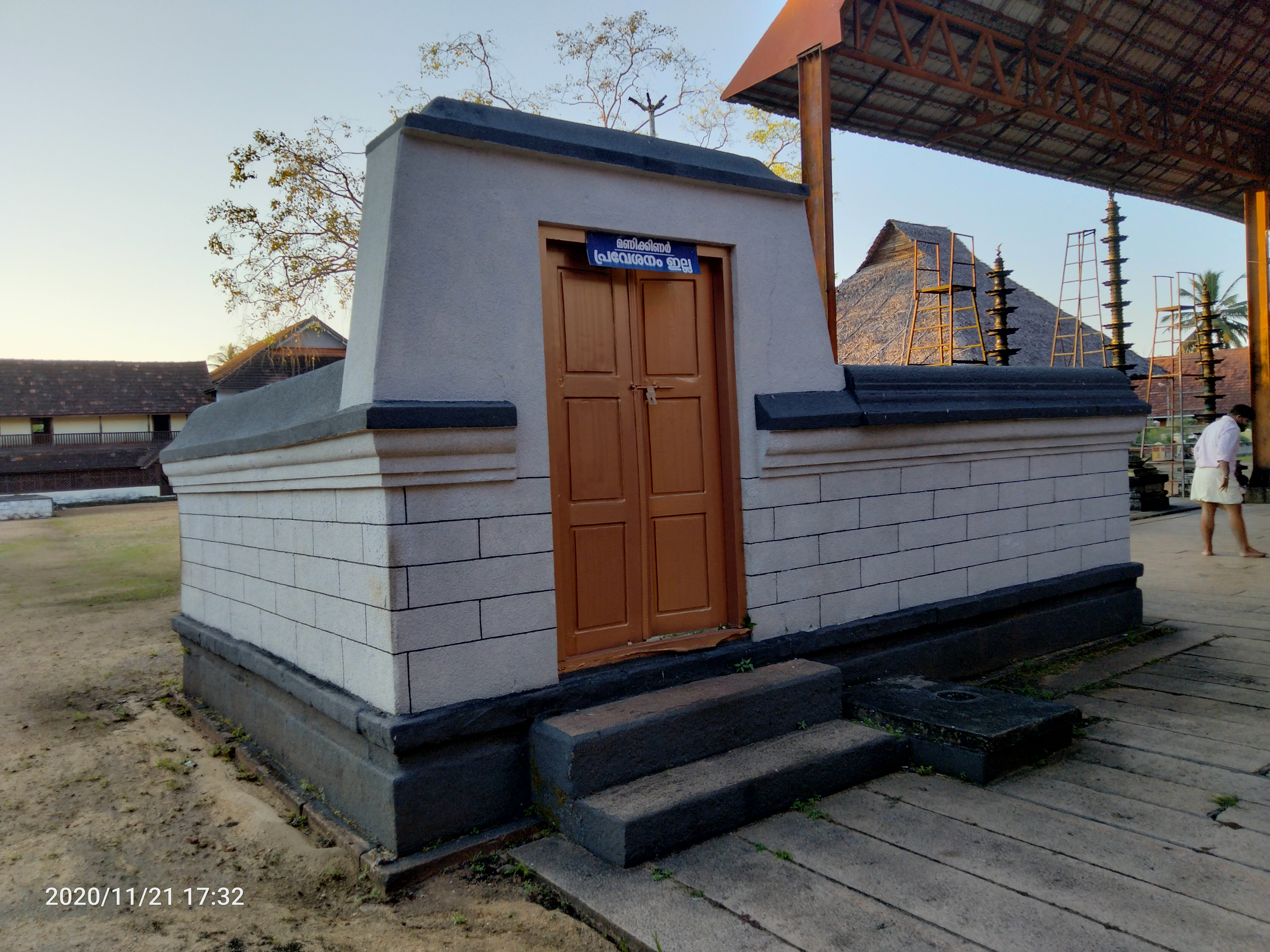
Holy well

Ambalappuzha Sree Krishna Temple and pond

Ficus religiosa

== See also ==
- Ambalappuzha Vijayakrishnan
- Temples of Kerala
- Temple festivals of Kerala
