= High-availability application architecture =

Software architecture design method

In information technology, high-availability application architecture is a process followed when implementing a new application into an existing business-wide computer system or ERP while minimizing downtime.

The architecture contains three stages: development, quality assurance, and production.

== Definition ==
In the above definition, high availability is "a design and implementation that ensures a certain degree of operational continuity", and application architecture refers to the actual concept and design of implementing a new configuration into the particular system.

== Summary ==
In the IT world minimizing downtime is very important, and in order to implement a new configuration into an existing computer system one must follow strict architectural guidelines before releasing the new configuration into production. Following the application architecture guidelines will greatly reduce the potential downtime when implementing a new configuration into an existing system.

== Stages of architecture ==
There are three stages that an application must go through before it "goes live." Each of these stages must pass through the transport directory before going on to the next stage.

=== Development ===
The development stage is where program changes, and configuration settings are modified to meet the needs of the new or existing system.

=== Quality assurance ===
During the quality assurance stage the configuration settings, and program changes that impact the application are tested. If any faults are detected, they are corrected during this stage.

=== Production ===
The final stage that the application enters is the production stage, which entails the actual system that a company runs its business on.

== Transport directory ==
The transport directory serves as a compiler for all of the changes to the application that occur through the stages. This component is the mechanism that allows the changes to be tracked from stage to stage. When the application is released for production, it will be delivered out of the transport directory.
