= Service (systems architecture) =

Set of related software functionalities that can be reused for different purposes

In the contexts of software architecture, service is a set of software functionality (such as the retrieval of specified information or the execution of a set of operations) that different clients can reuse, together with the policies that should control its usage (based on the identity of the client requesting the service, for example). service-orientation and service-oriented architecture, OASIS defines a service as "a mechanism to enable access to one or more capabilities, where the access is provided using a prescribed interface and is exercised consistent with constraints and policies as specified by the service description".

SOMF (Service-Oriented Modelling Framework) defines a service as "a cohesive entity that encapsulates business requirements and can be technologically defined as a software component".

Typical examples include web services, which provide third parties with access to specific functions over the Internet, network or system services, and telecommunications services. Also, application services that help, for example, track schedules, book appointments, accelerate order processing, and manage resources via a web interface.

== Service engineering ==
A business analyst, domain expert, and/or enterprise architecture team will develop the organization's service model first by defining the top level business functions. Once the business functions are defined, they are further partitioned and refined into services that represent the processes and activities needed to manage the assets of the organization in their various states. One example is the separation of the business function "Manage Orders" into services such as "Create Order", "Fulfill Order", "Ship Order", "Invoice Order" and "Cancel/Update Order". These business functions have to have a granularity that is adequate in the given project and domain context.

Many analysis and design methods can be used for service engineering, both general purpose ones such as OpenUP and Domain-Driven Design as well as those discussed under Service-oriented modeling.

== Bibliography ==
- Stojanović, Zoran; Dahanayake, Ajantha, eds. (2005). Service-oriented software system engineering: challenges and practices. Hershey: Idea Group Pub. ISBN 978-1-59140-426-2.
- Benatallah, Boualem; Casati, Fabio; Traverso, Paolo, eds. (2005). Service-Oriented Computing ICSOC 2005: Third International Conference, Amsterdam, The Netherlands, December 12-15, 2005, Proceedings. Lecture Notes in Computer Science. Berlin, Heidelberg: Springer Berlin Heidelberg. ISBN 978-3-540-30817-1.
- Huang, Jingshan (2007). Service-Oriented Computing: AAMAS 2007 International Workshop, SOCASE 2007, Honolulu, HI, USA, May 14, 2007, Proceedings. Lecture Notes in Computer Science Ser. Ryszard Kowalczyk, Zakaria Maamar, David Martin, Ingo Müller, Suzette Stoutenburg, Katia Sycara. Berlin, Heidelberg: Springer Berlin / Heidelberg. ISBN 978-3-540-72618-0.
- Karakostas, Bill; Zorgios, Yannis (2008). Engineering service oriented systems: a model driven approach. Hershey, PA: IGI Pub. ISBN 978-1-59904-968-7. OCLC 212204291.
- Kowalczyk, Ryszard (2008). Service-Oriented Computing: AAMAS 2008 International Workshop, SOCASE 2008 Estoril, Portugal, May 12, 2008 Proceedings. Lecture Notes in Computer Science Ser. Michael N. Huhns, Matthias Klusch, Zakaria Maamar, Quoc Bao Vo. Berlin, Heidelberg: Springer Berlin / Heidelberg. ISBN 978-3-540-79967-2.
- Hutchison, David; Pandu Rangan, C.; Ripeanu, Matei; Steffen, Bernhard; Sudan, Madhu; Terzopoulos, Demetri; Tygar, Doug; Vardi, Moshe Y.; Weikum, Gerhard, eds. (2009). Service-Oriented Computing - ICSOC 2007 Workshops: ICSOC 2007, International Workshops, Vienna, Austria, September 17, 2007, Revised Selected Papers. Lecture Notes in Computer Science. Berlin, Heidelberg: Springer Berlin Heidelberg. ISBN 978-3-540-93850-7.
- Hutchison, David; Nierstrasz, Oscar; Pandu Rangan, C.; Steffen, Bernhard; Sudan, Madhu; Terzopoulos, Demetri; Tygar, Doug; Vardi, Moshe Y.; Weikum, Gerhard, eds. (2009). Service-Oriented Computing – ICSOC 2008 Workshops: ICSOC 2008 International Workshops, Sydney, Australia, December 1st, 2008, Revised Selected Papers. Lecture Notes in Computer Science. Berlin, Heidelberg: Springer Berlin Heidelberg. ISBN 978-3-642-01246-4.
- Baresi, Luciano; Chi, Chi-Hung; Suzuki, Jun (2009). Service-Oriented Computing: 7th International Joint Conference, ICSOC-ServiceWave 2009, Stockholm, Sweden, November 24-27, 2009. Proceedings. Lecture Notes in Computer Science. Berlin, Heidelberg: Springer Berlin Heidelberg. ISBN 978-3-642-10382-7.
- Kowalczyk, Ryszard; Huhns, Michael; Maamar, Zakaria; Vo, Quoc Bao (2009). Service-Oriented Computing: Agents, Semantics, and Engineering: AAMAS 2009 International Workshop SOCASE 2009, Budapest, Hungary, May 11, 2009. Proceedings. Lecture Notes in Computer Science. Berlin, Heidelberg: Springer Berlin Heidelberg. ISBN 978-3-642-10738-2.
- Hafner, Michael; Breu, Ruth (2009). Security engineering for service-oriented architectures. Berlin Heidelberg: Springer. ISBN 978-3-540-79538-4.
- Dan, Asit (2010). Service-Oriented Computing. ICSOC/ServiceWave 2009 Workshops: International Workshops, ICSOC/ServiceWave 2009, Stockholm, Sweden, November 23-27, 2009, Revised Selected Papers. Lecture Notes in Computer Science Ser. Farouk Toumani, édéric Gittler. Berlin, Heidelberg: Springer Berlin / Heidelberg. ISBN 978-3-642-16131-5.
- Maglio, Paul P. (2010). Service-Oriented Computing: 8th International Conference, ICSOC 2010, San Francisco, CA, USA, December 7-10, 2010. Proceedings. Lecture Notes in Computer Science Ser. Mathias Weske, Jian Yang, Marcelo Fantinato. Berlin, Heidelberg: Springer Berlin / Heidelberg. ISBN 978-3-642-17357-8.
- Di Nitto, Elisabetta; Yahyapour, Ramin, eds. (2010). Towards a service-based Internet: third European conference, Servicewave 2010, Ghent, Belgium, December 13-15, 2010: proceedings. Lecture notes in computer science. Berlin; New York: Springer. ISBN 978-3-642-17693-7. OCLC 690089043.
- Sicilia, Miguel-Angel; Kop, Christian; Sartori, Fabio, eds. (2010). Ontology, Conceptualization and Epistemology for Information Systems, Software Engineering and Service Science: 4th International Workshop, ONTOSE 2010, held at CAiSE 2010, Hammamet, Tunisia, June 7-8, 2010, Revised Selected Papers. Lecture Notes in Business Information Processing. Berlin, Heidelberg: Springer Berlin Heidelberg. ISBN 978-3-642-16495-8.
- Kappel, Gerti; Motahari-Nezhad, Hamid R.; Maamar, Zakaria (2011). Service-Oriented Computing: 9th International Conference, ICSOC 2011, Paphos, Cyprus, December 5-8, 2011 Proceedings. Lecture Notes in Computer Science. Berlin, Heidelberg: Springer Berlin Heidelberg Springer e-books. ISBN 978-3-642-25535-9.
- Dustdar, Schahram; Li, Fei (2011). Service Engineering: European Research Results. SpringerLink Bücher. Vienna: Springer-Verlag/Wien. ISBN 978-3-7091-0414-9.
- Maximilien, E. Michael (2011). Service-oriented computing: ICSOC 2010 International Workshops, PAASC, WESOA, SEE, and SOC-LOG, San Francisco, CA, USA, December 7-10, 2010, Revised selected papers. Lecture notes in computer science. ICSOC 2010. Berlin Heidelberg New York: Springer. ISBN 978-3-642-19394-1.
- Abramowicz, Witold (2011). Towards a Service-Based Internet: 4th European Conference, ServiceWave 2011, Poznan, Poland, October 26-28, 2011, Proceedings. Lecture Notes in Computer Science Ser. Ignacio M. Llorente, Mike Surridge, Julien Vayssière, Andrea Zisman. Berlin, Heidelberg: Springer Berlin / Heidelberg. ISBN 978-3-642-24754-5.
- Ng, Irene (2011). Complex Engineering Service Systems: Concepts and Research. Decision Engineering Ser. Duncan McFarlane, Glenn Parry, Paul Tasker, Peter Wild. London: Springer London, Limited. ISBN 978-0-85729-188-2.
- Engineering methods in the service-oriented context: 4th IFIP WG 8.1 working conference on method engineering, ME 2011, Paris, France, April 20-22, 2011, proceedings. IFIP advances in information and communication technology. Heidelberg: Springer. 2011. ISBN 978-3-642-19996-7.
- Hölzl, Matthias (2011). Rigorous Software Engineering for Service-Oriented Systems: Results of the SENSORIA Project on Software Engineering for Service-Oriented Computing. Lecture Notes in Computer Science Ser. Martin Wirsing. Berlin, Heidelberg: Springer Berlin / Heidelberg. ISBN 978-3-642-20400-5.
- Dustdar, Schahram; Li, Fei (2011). Service Engineering: European Research Results. SpringerLink Bücher. Vienna: Springer-Verlag/Wien. ISBN 978-3-7091-0414-9.
- Service science, management, and engineering: theory and applications. Intelligent systems series (1st ed.). Oxford, U.K. Waltham, Mass: Academic Press. 2012. ISBN 978-0-12-397037-4.
- Lankhorst, Marc, ed. (2012). Agile service development: combining adaptive methods and flexible solutions. Enterprise engineering series. Heidelberg; New York: Springer Verlag. ISBN 978-3-642-28187-7. OCLC 773666019.
- Heisel, Maritta (2012). Software service and application engineering: essays dedicated to Bernd Krärmer on the occasion of his 65th birthday. Lecture notes in computer science. Berlin: Springer. ISBN 978-3-642-30835-2.
- Kumar, Sandeep (2012). Agent-Based Semantic Web Service Composition. SpringerBriefs in Electrical and Computer Engineering Ser (1st ed.). New York, NY: Springer New York. ISBN 978-1-4614-4662-0.
- Spohrer, James C.; Freund, Louis E., eds. (2013). Advances in the human side of service engineering. Advances in human factors and ergonomics series (Online-Ausg ed.). Boca Raton, Fla: CRC Press. ISBN 978-1-4398-7026-6.
- Basu, Samik; Zhang, Liang (2013). Pautasso, Cesare; Fu, Xiang (eds.). Service-Oriented Computing: 11th International Conference, ICSOC 2013, Berlin, Germany, December 2-5, 2013, Proceedings. Lecture Notes in Computer Science. Berlin, Heidelberg: Springer. ISBN 978-3-642-45004-4.
- Lomuscio, Alessio R. (2014). Nepal, Surya; Patrizi, Fabio; Benatallah, Boualem; Brandić, Ivona (eds.). Service-Oriented Computing – ICSOC 2013 Workshops: CCSA, CSB, PASCEB, SWESE, WESOA, and PhD Symposium, Berlin, Germany, December 2-5, 2013. Revised Selected Papers. Lecture Notes in Computer Science. Cham: Springer. ISBN 978-3-319-06858-9.
- Service-oriented and cloud computing: Third European Conference, ESOCC 2014, Manchester, UK, September 2-4, 2014. Proceedings. Lecture notes in computer science (1st ed.). New York: Springer. 2014. ISBN 978-3-662-44878-6.
- Service-oriented computing: 12th International Conference, ICSOC 2014, Paris, France, November 3-6, 2014. Proceedings. Lecture notes in computer science (1st ed.). New York: Springer. 2014. ISBN 978-3-662-45390-2.
- Qiu, Robin G. (2014). Service Science: The Foundations of Service Engineering and Management (1st ed.). Somerset: John Wiley & Sons, Incorporated. ISBN 978-1-118-10823-9.
- Motta, Gianmario (2014). Software Engineering Education for a Global e-Service Economy: State of the Art, Trends and Developments. Progress in IS Ser. Bing Wu (1st ed.). Cham: Springer International Publishing AG. ISBN 978-3-319-04216-9.
- Fox, Armando; Patterson, David A. (2016). Joseph, Samuel (ed.). Engineering software as a service: an Agile approach using cloud computing (1.2.2 ed.). San Francisco, Calif: Strawberry Canyon LLC. ISBN 978-0-9848812-3-9.
- Maximilien, Michael (2017). Service-Oriented Computing: 15th International Conference, ICSOC 2017, Malaga, Spain, November 13-16, 2017, Proceedings. Lecture Notes in Computer Science Ser. Antonio Vallecillo, Jianmin Wang, Marc Oriol. Cham: Springer International Publishing AG. ISBN 978-3-319-69034-6.
- Ahram, Tareq Z.; Karwowski, Waldemar, eds. (2017). Advances in The Human Side of Service Engineering: Proceedings of the AHFE 2016 International Conference on The Human Side of Service Engineering, July 27-31, 2016, Walt Disney World®, Florida, USA. Advances in Intelligent Systems and Computing. Cham s.l: Springer International Publishing. ISBN 978-3-319-41947-3.
- Meyer, Kyrill (2018). Service Engineering: Von Dienstleistungen Zu Digitalen Service-Systemen. Stephan Klingner, Christian Zinke. Wiesbaden: Vieweg. ISBN 978-3-658-20904-9.
- Ravindran, A. Ravi; Griffin, Paul; Prabhu, Vittaldas V. (2018). Service systems engineering and management. The operations research series. Boca Raton: Taylor & Francis, a CRC title, part of the Taylor & Francis imprint, a member of the Taylor & Francis Group, the academic division of T & F Informa, plc. ISBN 978-1-351-05418-8.
- Höckmayr, Benedikt S. (2019). Engineering Service Systems in the Digital Age. Markt- und Unternehmensentwicklung Markets and Organisations Ser. Wiesbaden: Springer Vieweg. in Springer Fachmedien Wiesbaden GmbH. ISBN 978-3-658-26202-0.
- Yangui, Sami (2020). Service-Oriented Computing - ICSOC 2019 Workshops: WESOACS, ASOCA, ISYCC, TBCE, and STRAPS, Toulouse, France, October 28-31, 2019, Revised Selected Papers. Lecture Notes in Computer Science Ser. Athman Bouguettaya, Xiao Xue, Noura Faci, Walid Gaaloul, Qi Yu, Zhangbing Zhou, Nathalie Hernandez, Elisa Y. Nakagawa. Cham: Springer International Publishing AG. ISBN 978-3-030-45988-8.
- Brogi, Antonio (2020). Service-Oriented and Cloud Computing: 8th IFIP WG 2. 14 European Conference, ESOCC 2020, Heraklion, Crete, Greece, September 28-30, 2020, Proceedings. Lecture Notes in Computer Science Ser. Wolf Zimmermann, Kyriakos Kritikos. Cham: Springer International Publishing AG. ISBN 978-3-030-44768-7.
- Hacid, Hakim (2021). Service-Oriented Computing - ICSOC 2020 Workshops: AIOps, CFTIC, STRAPS, AI-PA, AI-IOTS, and Satellite Events, Dubai, United Arab Emirates, December 14-17, 2020, Proceedings. Lecture Notes in Computer Science Ser. Fatma Outay, Hye-Young Paik, Amira Alloum, Marinella Petrocchi, Mohamed Reda Bouadjenek, Amin Beheshti, Xumin Liu, Abderrahmane Maaradji. Cham: Springer International Publishing AG. ISBN 978-3-030-76351-0.
- Jarzębowicz, Aleksander; Luković, Ivan; Przybyłek, Adam; Staron, Miroslaw; Ahmad, Muhammad Ovais; Ochodek, Mirosław, eds. (2024). Software, System, and Service Engineering: S3E 2023 Topical Area, 24th Conference on Practical Aspects of and Solutions for Software Engineering, KKIO 2023, and 8th Workshop on Advances in Programming Languages, WAPL 2023, Held as Part of FedCSIS 2023, Warsaw, Poland, 17–20 September 2023, Revised Selected Papers. Lecture Notes in Business Information Processing (1st ed. 2024 ed.). Cham: Springer Nature Switzerland. ISBN 978-3-031-51074-8.
