= Service-oriented device architecture =

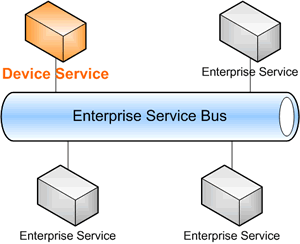

The purpose of service-oriented device architecture (SODA) is to enable devices to be connected to a service-oriented architecture (SOA). Currently, developers connect enterprise services to an enterprise service bus (ESB) using the various web service standards that have evolved since the advent of XML in 1998. With SODA, developers are able to connect devices to the ESB and users can access devices in exactly the same manner that they would access any other web service.
