= Karl Borromäus Alexander Sessa =

Prussian physician and playwright

- Born: 20 December 1786; Breslau, Kingdom of Prussia
- Died: 4 December 1813 (aged 26); Breslau, Kingdom of Prussia
- Occupations: Physician, playwright
- Writing career
- Language: German

Karl Borromäus Alexander Sessa (20 December 1786 – 4 December 1813) was a Prussian physician and playwright, known for his anti-Semitic sentiments.

== Biography ==
Karl Borromäus Alexander Sessa was born in Breslau, Prussia, in 1786. He studied philosophy and medicine at various universities, graduating as doctor of medicine in Frankfort-on-the-Oder in 1807. He subsequently served as a district physician in his hometown.

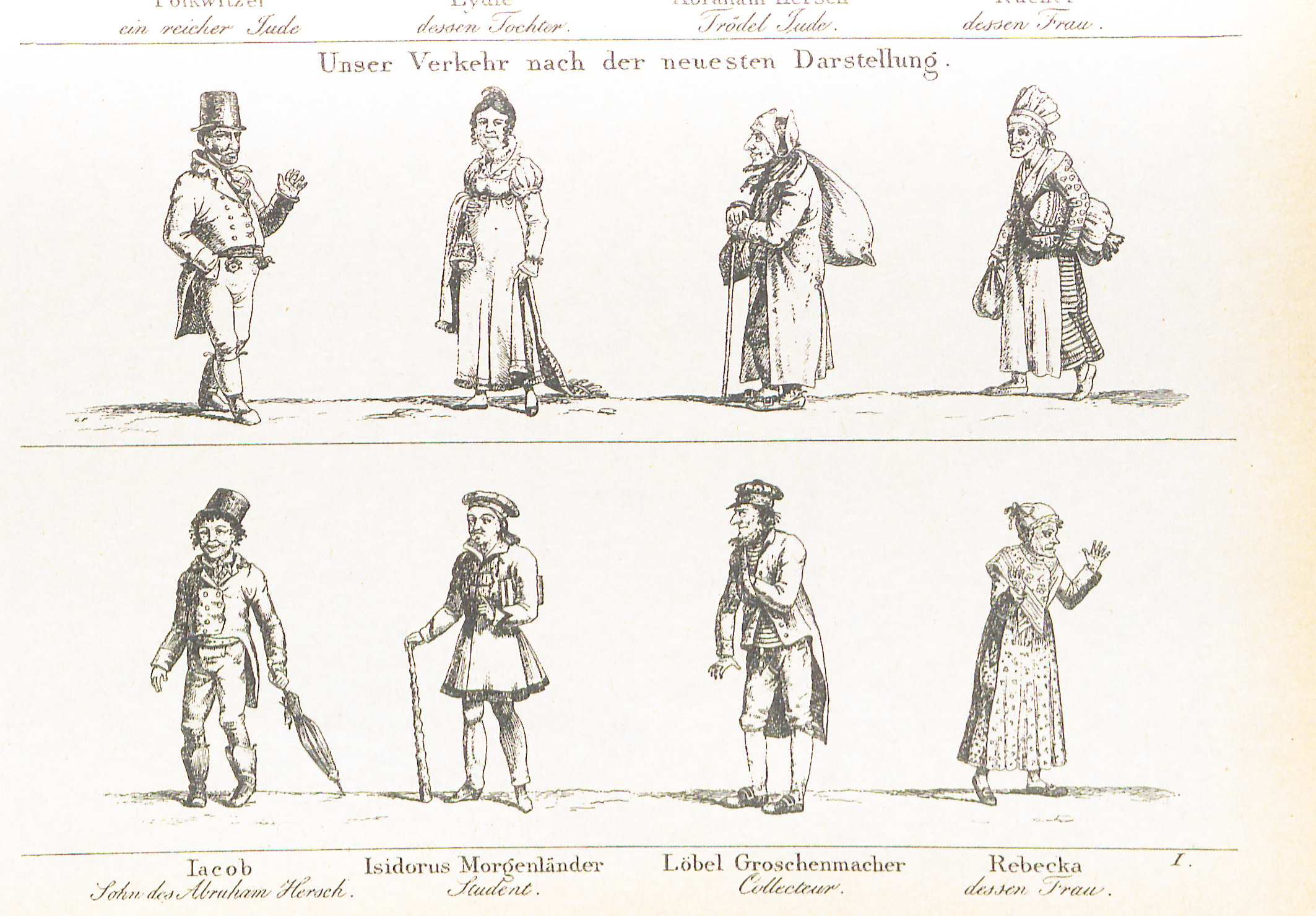
Dramatis personae of Unser Verkehr

In addition to composing essays on medical topics and various pieces of poetry and drama, Sessa published anonymously a comedic work titled Die Judenschule ('The Jewish School'), presumably in response to the Prussian Edict of Emancipation. The play portrayed Jewish characters in an extremely derogatory manner, depicting them as solely driven by base financial motives. It debuted in Breslau on 11 February 1813 and was later staged in Berlin and other locations under the title Unser Verkehr ('Our Intercourse'), until authorities intervened and prohibited its further performances.
