= Technology strategy =

Strategy of technology use

Technology strategy (information technology strategy or IT strategy) is the overall plan which consists of objectives, principles and tactics relating to use of technologies within a particular organization. Such strategies primarily focus on the technologies themselves and in some cases the people who directly manage those technologies. The strategy can be implied from the organization's behaviors towards technology decisions, and may be written down in a document. The strategy includes the formal vision that guides the acquisition, allocation, and management of IT resources so it can help fulfill the organizational objectives.

Other generations of technology-related strategies primarily focus on: the efficiency of the company's spending on technology; how people, for example the organization's customers and employees, exploit technologies in ways that create value for the organization; on the full integration of technology-related decisions with the company's strategies and operating plans, such that no separate technology strategy exists other than the de facto strategic principle that the organization does not need or have a discrete 'technology strategy'.

A technology strategy has traditionally been expressed in a document that explains how technology should be utilized as part of an organization's overall corporate strategy and each business strategy. In the case of IT, the strategy is usually formulated by a group of representatives from both the business and from IT. Often the Information Technology Strategy is led by an organization's Chief Technology Officer (CTO) or equivalent. Accountability varies for an organization's strategies for other classes of technology. Although many companies write an overall business plan each year, a technology strategy may cover developments somewhere between three and five years into the future.

The United States identified the need to implement a technology strategy in order to restore the country's competitive edge. In 1983 Project Socrates, a US Defense Intelligence Agency program, was established to develop a national technology strategy policy.

== Effective strategy ==
A successful technology strategy involves the documentation of planning assumptions and the development of success metrics. These establish a mission-driven strategy, which ensures that initiatives are aligned with the organization's goals and objectives. This aspect underscores that the primary objective of designing technology strategy is to make sure that the business strategy can be realized through technology and that technology investments are aligned with business. Some experts underscore the successful technology strategy is one that is integrated within the organization's overall business strategy not just to contribute to the mission and vision of the company but also get support from it.

There are frameworks (e.g., ASSIMPLER) available that provide insights into the current and future business strategy, assess business-IT alignment on various parameters, identify gaps, and define technology roadmaps and budgets. These highlight key information, which include the following:

- The important components of information tech-strategy is information technology and strategic planning working together.
- The IT strategy alignment is the capability of IT functionality to both shape, and support business strategy.
- The degree to which the IT mission, objectives, and plans support and are supported by the business mission, objective, and plans.

For a strategy to be effective, it should also answer questions of how to create value, deliver value, and capture value. In order to create value, one needs to trace back the technology and forecast on how the technology evolves, how the market penetration changes, and how to organize effectively. Capturing value requires knowledge how to gain competitive advantage and sustain it, and how to compete in case that standards of technology is important. The final step is delivering the value, where firms define how to execute the strategy, make strategic decisions and take decisive actions. The Strategic Alignment Process is a step-by-step process that helps managers stay focused on specific task in order to execute the task and deliver value.

== Meta-model of (IT) technology strategy ==
Aligned with Statement Of Applicability (SOA) approach, IT strategy is composed of IT Capability Model (ITCM) and IT Operating Model (IT-OM) as proposed by Haloedscape IT Strategy Model.

== Framework of (IT) technology strategy ==
Process of IT Strategy is simplified with framework constituted of IT Service Management (ITSM), Enterprise Architecture Development (TOGAF) and Governance (COBIT). IT Strategy is modeled as vertical IT service applied to and supported by each horizontal layers of SOA architecture. For details, refer Haloedscape IT Strategy Framework.

== Typical structure of a (IT) technology strategy ==
The following are typically sections of a technology strategy:

- Executive Summary – This is a summary of the IT strategy.
  - High level organizational benefits
  - Project objective and scope
  - Approach and methodology of the engagement
  - Relationship to overall business strategy
  - Resource summary
    - Staffing
    - Budgets
    - Summary of key projects
- Internal capabilities
  - IT project portfolio management – An inventory of current projects being managed by the information technology department and their status. Note: It is not common to report current project status inside a future-looking strategy document. Show Return on Investment (ROI) and timeline for implementing each application.
  - A catalog of existing applications supported, and the level of resources required to support them
  - Architectural directions and methods for implementation of IT solutions
  - Current IT departmental

Includes a SWOT Analysis SWOT analysis

- Strengths
  - Current IT departments strengths
- Weaknesses
  - Current IT department weaknesses
- External Forces
  - Summary of changes driven from outside the organization
  - Rising expectations of users
    - Example: Growth of high-quality web user interfaces driven by Ajax technology
    - Example: Availability of open source learning management systems
  - List of new IT projects requested by the organization.
- Opportunities
  - Description of new cost reduction or efficiency increase opportunities.
    - Example: List of available Professional Service contractors for short term projects
  - Description of how Moore's law (faster processors, networks or storage at lower costs) will impact the organization's ROI for technology.
- Threats
  - Description of disruptive forces that could cause the organization to become less profitable or competitive.
  - Analysis IT usage by competition
- IT Organization structure and Governance
  - IT organization roles and responsibilities
  - IT role description
  - IT governance
- Milestones
  - List of monthly, quarterly or mid-year milestones and review dates to indicate if the strategy is on track.
  - List milestone name, deliverables and metrics

== Audience ==
A technology strategy document is usually designed to be read by non-technical stakeholders involved in business planning within an organization. It should be free of technical jargon and information technology acronyms.

The IT strategy should also be presented or read by internal IT staff members. Many organizations will circulate prior year versions to internal IT department for feedback. The feedback is used to create new annual IT strategy plans.

One critical integration point is the interface with an organization's marketing plan. The marketing plan frequently requires the support of a web site to create an appropriate on-line presence. Large organizations frequently have complex web site requirements such as web content management.

== Implementation ==
The implementation of technology strategy will likely follow the conventional procedure taken when implementing a business strategy or an organization's planned changes within the so-called change management framework. Fundamentally, it is directed by a manager who oversees the process, which could include gaining targeted org. For instance, in the area of systematic exploration of emerging technologies, this approach help determine the relevance and opportunities offered by new technologies to business through its well-defined assessment mechanisms that can effectively justify adoption.

== Relationship between strategy and enterprise technology architecture ==
A technology strategy document typically refers to but does not duplicate an overall enterprise architecture. The technology strategy may refer to:

- High-level view of logical architecture of information technology systems
- High-level view of physical architecture of information technology systems
- Technology rationalization plan

== See also ==
- Business strategy
- Enterprise planning systems
- Project portfolio management
- Second half of the chessboard
- Strategy
