= Service-oriented software engineering =

Service-oriented software engineering (SOSE), also referred to as service engineering, is a software engineering methodology focused on the development of software systems by composition of reusable services (service-orientation) often provided by other service providers. Since it involves composition, it shares many characteristics of component-based software engineering, the composition of software systems from reusable components, but it adds the ability to dynamically locate necessary services at run-time. These services may be provided by others as web services, but the essential element is the dynamic nature of the connection between the service users and the service providers.

== Service-oriented interaction pattern ==
There are three types of actors in a service-oriented interaction: service providers, service users and service registries. They participate in a dynamic collaboration which can vary from time to time. Service providers are software services that publish their capabilities and availability with service registries. Service users are software systems (which may be services themselves) that accomplish some task through the use of services provided by service providers. Service users use service registries to discover and locate the service providers they can use. This discovery and location occurs dynamically when the service user requests them from a service registry.

== See also ==
- Service-oriented architecture (SOA)
- Service-oriented analysis and design
- Separation of concerns
- Component-based software engineering
- Web services
