= Applications architecture =

Type of architecture domain within enterprise architecture

In information systems, applications architecture or application architecture is one of several architecture domains that form the pillars of an enterprise architecture (EA).

== Scope ==
An applications architecture describes the behavior of applications used in a business, focused on how they interact with each other and with users. It is focused on the data consumed and produced by applications rather than their internal structure.

By example, in application portfolio management, applications are mapped to business functions and processes as well as costs, functional quality and technical quality in order to assess the value provided.

The applications architecture is specified on the basis of business and functional requirements. This involves defining the interaction between application packages, databases, and middleware systems in terms of functional coverage. This helps identify any integration problems or gaps in functional coverage.

A migration plan can then be drawn up for systems which are at the end of the software life cycle or which have inherent technological risks, a potential to disrupt the business as a consequence of a technological failure.

Applications architecture tries to ensure the suite of applications being used by an organization to create the composite architecture is scalable, reliable, available and manageable.

Applications architecture defines how multiple applications are poised to work together. It is different from software architecture, which deals with technical designs of how a system is built.

One not only needs to understand and manage the dynamics of the functionalities the composite architecture is implementing but also help formulate the deployment strategy and keep an eye out for technological risks that could jeopardize the growth and/or operations of the organization.

== Strategy ==
Applications architecture strategy involves ensuring the applications and the integration align with the growth strategy of the organization.

If an organization is a manufacturing organization with fast growth plans through acquisitions, the applications architecture should be nimble enough to encompass inherited legacy systems as well as other large competing systems.

== Patterns ==
Applications can be classified in various types depending on the applications architecture pattern they follow.

A "pattern" has been defined as:

"an idea that has been useful in one practical context and will probably be useful in others”.

To create patterns, one needs building blocks. Building blocks are components of software, mostly reusable, which can be utilized to create certain functions. Patterns are a way of putting building blocks into context and describe how to use the building blocks to address one or multiple architectural concerns.

An application is a compilation of various functionalities, all typically following the same pattern. This pattern defines the application's pattern.

Application patterns can describe structural (deployment/distribution-related) or behavioural (process flow or interaction/integration-related) characteristics and an application architecture may leverage one or a mix of patterns.

The idea of patterns has been around almost since the beginning of computer science, but it was most famously popularized by the "Gang of Four" (GoF) though many of their patterns are "software architecture" patterns rather than "application architecture" patterns.

In addition to the GoF, Thomas Erl is a well-known author of various types of patterns, and most of the large software tools vendors, such as Microsoft, have published extensive pattern libraries.

Despite the plethora of patterns that have been published, there are relatively few patterns that can be thought of as "industry standard". Some of the best-known of these include:

- single-tier/thick client/desktop application (structural pattern): an application that exists only on a single computer, typically a desktop. One can, of course have the same desktop application on many computers, but they do not interact with one another (with rare exceptions).
- client–server/2-tier (structural pattern): an application that consists of a front-end (user-facing) layer running as a rich client that communicates to a back-end (server) which provides business logic, workflow, integration and data services. In contrast to desktop applications (which are single-user), client–server applications are almost always multi-user applications.
- n-tier (structural pattern): an extension of the client-server pattern, where the server functions are split into multiple layers, which are distributed onto different computers across a local-area network (LAN).
- distributed (structural pattern): an extension of the n-tier pattern where the server functions are distributed across a wide-area network (WAN) or cloud. This pattern also include some behavioural pattern attributes because the server functions must be designed to be more autonomous and function in an asynchronous dialog with the other functions in order to deal with potentially-significant latency that can occur in WAN and cloud deployment scenarios.
- horizontal scalability (structural pattern): a pattern for running multiple copies of server functions on multiple computers in such a way that increasing processing load can be spread across increasing numbers of instances of the functions rather than having to re-deploy the functions on larger, more powerful computers. Cloud-native applications are fundamentally-based on horizontal scalability.
- event-driven architecture (behavioural pattern): Data events (which may have initially originated from a device, application, user, data store or clock) and event detection logic which may conditionally discard the event, initiate an event-related process, alert a user or device manager, or update a data store. The event-driven pattern is fundamental to the asynchronous processing required by the distributed architecture pattern.
- ETL (behavioural pattern): An application process pattern for extracting data from an originating source, transforming that data according to some business rules, and then loading that data into a destination. Variations on the ETL pattern include ELT and ETLT.
- Request–Reply (behavioural pattern): An application integration pattern for exchanging data where the application requests data from another application and waits for a reply containing the requested data. This is the most prominent example of a synchronous pattern, in contrast to the asynchronous processing referred to in previous pattern descriptions.

The right applications pattern depends on the organization's industry and use of the component applications.

An organization could have a mix of multiple patterns if it has grown both organically and through acquisitions.

== Application architect ==
TOGAF describes both the skills and the role expectations of an Application architect. These skills include an understanding of application modularization/distribution, integration, high availability, and scalability patterns, technology and trends. Increasingly, an understanding of application containers, serverless computing, storage, data and analytics, and other cloud-related technology and services are required application architect skills. While a software background is a great foundation for an application architect, programming and software design are not skills required of an application architect (these are actually skills for a Software Architect, who is a leader on the computer programming team).

=== Knowledge domains ===
Application modeling
Employs modeling as a framework for the deployment and integration of new or enhanced applications, uses modeling to find problems, reduce risk, improve predictability, reduce cost and time-to-market, tests various product scenarios, incorporating clients' nonfunctional needs/requirements, adds test design decisions to the development process as necessary, evaluates product design problems.
Competitive intelligence, business modeling, strategic analysis
Understanding of the global marketplace, consumers, industries and competition, and how global business models, strategies, finances, operations and structures interrelate. Understanding of the competitive environment, including current trend in the market, industry, competition and regulatory environment, as well as understanding of how the components of business model (i.e. strategy, finances, operations) interrelate to make organization competitive in the marketplace. Understanding of organization's business processes, systems, tools, regulations and structure and how they interrelate to provide products and services that create value for customers, consumers and key stakeholders. Understanding of how the value create for customers, consumers and key stakeholders aligns with organization's vision, business, culture, value proposition, brand promise and strategic imperatives. Understanding of organization's past and present achievements and shortcomings to assess strengths, weaknesses, opportunities and risks in relation to the competitive environment.
Technology
Understanding of IT strategy, development lifecycle and application/infrastructure maintenance; Understanding of IT service and support processes to promote competitive advantage, create efficiencies and add value to the business.
Technology standards
Demonstrates a thorough understanding of the key technologies which form the infrastructure necessary to effectively support existing and future business requirements, ensures that all hardware and software comply with baseline requirements and standards before being integrated into the business environment, understands and is able to develop technical standards and procedures to facilitate the use of new technologies, develops useful guidelines for using and applying new technologies.

=== Tasks ===
An applications architect is a master of everything application-specific in an organization. An applications architect provides strategic guidelines to the applications maintenance teams by understanding all the applications from the following perspectives:

- Interoperability capability
- Performance and scalability
- Reliability and availability
- Application lifecycle stage
- Technological risks
- Number of instances

The above analysis will point out applications that need a range of changes – from change in deployment strategy for fragmented applications to a total replacement for applications at the end of their technology or functionality lifecycle.

==== Functionality footprint ====
Understand the system process flow of the primary business processes. It gives a clear picture of the functionality map and the applications footprint of various applications across the map.

Many organizations do not have documentation discipline and hence lack detailed business process flows and system process flows. One may have to start an initiative to put those in place first.

==== Create solution architecture guidelines ====
Every organization has a core set of applications that are used across multiple divisions either as a single instance or a different instance per division. Create a solution architecture template for all the core applications so that all the projects have a common starting ground for designing implementations.

The standards in architecture world are defined in TOGAF, The Open Group Architecture Framework describes the four components of EA as BDAT (Business architecture, Data architecture, Application Architecture and Technical architecture,

There are also other standards to consider, depending on the level of complexity of the organization:

- The Zachman Framework for EA
- Federal enterprise architecture (FEA)
- Gartner

== See also ==
- ISO/IEC 42010 Systems and software engineering — Architecture description is an international standard for architecture descriptions of systems and software.
- IEEE 1471 a superseded IEEE Standard for describing the architecture of a "software-intensive system", also known as software architecture.
- IBM Systems Application Architecture
- Enterprise architecture planning
- High-availability application architecture
