= Sissa (mythical brahmin) =

Mythical character from India

The ancient Brahmin mathematician Sissa (also spelt Sessa or Sassa and also known as Sissa ibn Dahir or Lahur Sessa) is a mythical character from the village of Lahur, known for the invention of chaturanga, the predecessor of chess, and the wheat and chessboard problem he presented to the king when he was asked what reward he wanted for that invention.

== Legend ==
Sissa, a Hindu Brahmin (in some legends from the village of Lahur), invents chess for an Indian king (named as Balhait, Shahram or Ladava in different legends, with "Taligana" sometimes named as the supposed kingdom he ruled in northern India) for educational purposes. In gratitude, the king asks Sissa how he wants to be rewarded. Sissa wishes to receive an amount of grain which is the sum of one grain on the first square of the chess board, and which is then doubled on every following square.

This request is now known as the wheat and chessboard problem, and forms the basis of various mathematical and philosophical questions.

== Historicity ==
Until the nineteenth century, the legend of Sissa was one of several theories about the origin of chess. Today it is mainly regarded as a myth because there is no clear picture of the origin of chaturanga (an ancient Indian chess game), and from which modern chess has developed.

The context of the mythical Sissa is described in detail in A History of Chess. There are many variations and inconsistencies, and therefore little can be confirmed historically. Nevertheless, the legend of Sissa is placed by most sources in a Hindu kingdom between 400 and 600 AD, in an era after the invasion of Alexander the Great. The myth is also told from Persian and Islamic perspectives.

However, the oldest known narrative believed to have been the basis for the legend of Sissa is from before the advent of Islam. It tells of Husiya, daughter of Balhait, a queen whose son is killed by a rebel, but of whom she does not initially hear the news. This news is subtly announced to her through the chess game that Sissa introduced to her.

== Sources ==
This article has been created by partial adoption from and translation of the Dutch Wikipedia Sissa (Mythische Brahmaan).
