= Service Mapping Description =

Proposed web services standard

Service Mapping Description (SMD) is a proposed standard for describing, in a machine-readable JSON format, the web services available at a particular endpoint. The goal is similar in principle to WSDL.
