= SSDM =

SSDM may refer to:

- Seabed Survey Data Model, a format for geographic information system data, developed by the International Association of Oil & Gas Producers
- Semantic service discovery mechanisms, a component of Task Computing Frameworks in computer programming
- Short stick defensive midfielder, a player position in field lacrosse
- South Sudan Democratic Movement, a rebel organisation in South Sudan
- Stochastic Signal Density Modulation, a novel power modulation technique primarily for LED power control
