= Stovepipe =

Stovepipe may refer to:

- Exhaust pipe

== Clothing ==
- Stovepipe hat, a tall top hat with a consistent width
- Stovepipe pants, style of slim-fit pants also known as drainpipes

== Information technology ==
- Stovepipe (organisation), where the structure of the organization restricts flow of information through rigid lines of control
- Stovepipe system or stovepiping, the informal name given to a category of criticisms applied to assemblages of technology
- Stovepiping, the use of improper channels to pass unvetted information to policy-makers

== People ==
- Stovepipe Johnson (1834–1922), American Civil War colonel
- Daddy Stovepipe (1867–1963), African-American blues singer

== Other uses ==
- Stovepipe Cup, a design of the NHL's Stanley Cup, in use from 1927 to 1947
- Stovepipe (instrument), a musical instrument often used in jug bands
- Stovepipe jam, a type of firearm malfunction
- Stovepipe (play), by Adam Brace
- Stovepipe tornado, storm chaser slang for a large cylindrically-shaped tornado

== See also ==
- Stovepipe Wells, California, a small way-station in Death Valley, US
- Stovepipe Wells Airport, an airport in California, US
- Devil's stovepipe, a hole formed when a tree that has been buried by an encroaching sand dune decomposes
