= SIFA =

SIFA may refer to:

- Sifa, a type of train safety system
- Sainsbury Institute for Art
- Schools Interoperability Framework Association
- Singapore International Festival of Arts
- Sweden India Film Association
- Sifa or Si Pha is the pen name of Thai author M.L. Srifa Ladavalaya Mahawan
- Shooting Industry Foundation of Australia, a pro-gun trade organization in Australia.
