= Schools Interoperability Framework =

Open specification for academic institutions

The Schools Interoperability Framework, Systems Interoperability Framework (UK), or SIF, is a data-sharing open specification for academic institutions from kindergarten through workforce. This specification is being used primarily in the United States, Canada, the UK, Australia, and New Zealand; however, it is increasingly being implemented in India, and elsewhere.

The specification comprises two parts: an XML specification for modeling educational data which is specific to the educational locale (such as North America, Australia or the UK), and a service-oriented architecture (SOA) based on both direct and brokered RESTful-models for sharing that data between institutions, which is international and shared between the locales.

SIF is not a product, but an industry initiative that enables diverse applications to interact and share data. As of March 2007, SIF was estimated to have been used in more than 48 US states and 6 countries, supporting five million students.

The specification was started and maintained by its specification body, the Schools Interoperability Framework Association, renamed the Access For Learning Community (A4L) in 2015.

== History ==
Traditionally, the standalone applications used by public school districts have the limitation of data isolation; that is, it is difficult to access and share their data. This often results in redundant data entry, data integrity problems, and inefficient or incomplete reporting. In such cases, a student's information can appear in multiple places but may not be identical, for example, or decision makers may be working with incomplete or inaccurate information. Many district and site technology coordinators also experience an increase in technical support problems from maintaining numerous proprietary systems. SIF was created to solve these issues.

The Schools Interoperability Framework (SIF) began as an initiative chiefly championed initially by Microsoft to create "a blueprint for educational software interoperability and data access." It was designed to be an initiative drawing upon the strengths of the leading vendors in the K-12 market to enable schools' IT professionals to build, manage and upgrade their systems. It was endorsed by close to 20 leading K-12 vendors of student information, library, transportation, food service applications and more. The first pilot sites began in the summer of 1999, and the first SIF-based products began to show up in 2000.

In the beginning it was not clear which approach would become the national standard in the United States. Both SIF and EDI were vying for the position in 2000 but SIF began taking the lead in 2002 or so. In 2000, the National School Boards Association held a panel discussion during its annual meeting on the topic of SIF.

In 2007 in the United Kingdom Becta has championed the adoption of SIF as a national standard for schools data interchange.

In 2008 it was announced that in the UK the standard will become known as the "Systems Interoperability Framework". This reflects the intention in the UK to develop SIF to be used in other organizations beyond just schools.

== Members ==
The SIF specification is supported by the A4L community. A4L members collaborate on a variety of technical solutions and standards which include but are not limited to the Schools Interoperability Framework.

Members include districts, states, vendors, non-profits, and various government agencies.

== Criticism ==
SIF has all the pains and challenges that come with any SOA specification and data model. When building specifications via consensus not everyone is always happy and sometimes the end product isn't perfect. Also given all the moving parts in modeling the entire K12's enterprise the specification has many points of possible failure. This is not particular to SIF but to any record-level, automated system moving standardized data from one source to another in a heterogeneous environment. Out-of-the-box interoperability and ease of use and implementation were part of a 12-18 month focus from 2007 and through 2009.

== How SIF Works ==
SIF 2.x relied on using a broker called a Zone Integration Server (ZIS) to manage communication between applications. SIF 3.x and SIF 2.8+ allows for both brokered and direct communication between applications.

=== Brokered ===
Rather than have each application vendor try to set up a separate connection to every other application, SIF has defined the set of rules and definitions to share data within a "SIF Zone"— or Environment which is a logical grouping of applications in which software application agents communicate with each other through a central communication point. Zones are managed by an enterprise data broker sometimes called a Zone Integration Server (ZIS). A single ZIS can manage multiple Zones. However, the current infrastructure specification supports RESTful connections directly between applications AND/OR utilizing a brokered environment.

Data travels between applications as a series of standardized messages, queries, and events written in XML or JSON and sent using Internet protocols. The SIF specification defines such events and the "choreography" that allows data to move back and forth between the applications.

=== Direct ===
Direct SIF allow one application to communicate directly to another via simple REST calls to PUT, POST, GET, or DELETE resources. This is ideal for simple environments with two or maybe three players where complex choreographies are not necessary. It is easier to implement than a brokered environment in two- or three-node situations.

=== Interface Code ===
SIF Agents are pieces of software that exist either internal to an application or installed next to it. The SIF Agents function as extensions of each application and serve as the intermediary between the software application and the SIF Zone. In brokered environments, the broker keeps track of the Agents registered in the environment and its Zones and manages transactions between Agents, enabling them to provide data and respond to requests. The broker controls all access, routing, and security within the system. Standardization of the behavior of the Agents and the broker means that SIF can add standard functionality to a Zone by simply adding SIF-enabled applications over time.

=== Vertical interoperability ===
"Vertical interoperability" is a situation in which SIF agents at different levels of an organization communicate using a SIF Zone. Vertical interoperability involves data collection from multiple agents (upward) or publishing of information to multiple agents (downward). For example, a state-level data warehouse may listen for changes in district-level data warehouses and update its database accordingly. Or a state entity may wish to publish teacher certification data to districts. The three pieces of the SIF specification that deal directly with vertical interoperability are the Student Locator object, the Vertical Reporting object, and the Data Warehouse object. A good example of this would be the Century Consultants SIS Agent working with the Pearson SLF Agent sending student data to the State Agency and getting Student Testing Identifiers in return.

== SIF in relation to other standards ==
SIF was designed before REST, SOAP, namespaces, and web service standards were as mature as they are today. As a result, it has a robust SOA that is more vetted than the current SOAP specifications but does not use the SOAP or WS standards. The 2.0 SIF Web Services specification began the process of joining these two worlds, and the 3.0 Infrastructure specification completes the transformation to a SOA specification using modern tools.

The 2.0 Web Services specification allows for more generalized XML messaging structures typically found in enterprise messaging systems that use the concept of an enterprise service bus. Web service standards are also designed to support secure public interfaces and XML appliances can make the setup and configuration easier. The SIF 2.0 Web Services specification allows for the use of Web Services to communicate in and out of the Zone.

The 3.0 Infrastructure allows any data payload to be moved across it and is designed around RESTful design patterns. It allows both brokered and direct exchanges in a RESTful manner utilizing either XML or JSON payloads.

=== CEDS ===
Starting with SIF 3.0 the SIF Specification relies entirely-unless impossible or not practical- on the Common Education Data Standards CEDS for its controlled vocabulary and element definition. This allows it to transport CEDS over the wire and be compatible with other CEDS-compliant data sets.

=== LISS (Australia) ===
A similar standard LISS supports vendor integration 'within' a school site. This overcomes some limitations where a school has elected to use a Zone integration server (not a requirement in SIF 3.x implementations) LISS Lightweight Interoperability Standard for Schools connects primarily smaller, 'local' modules, such as timetabling, roll call, reporting or others, to the main admin system on a given school site. LISS works either across the web, or via a local network, and has a simpler format.

=== Other Standards ===
SIFA is also working closely with the Postsecondary Electronic Standards Council (PESC), SCORM, and other standards organizations.

== Versions ==
In August 2013 the SIF Association announced the release of the SIF Implementation Specification 3.0. The SIF Implementation Specification (North America) 3.0 is made up of a globally utilized reference infrastructure and North America data model focusing on supporting the Common Education Data Standards (CEDS) initiative. The new 3.0 infrastructure allows the transport of various data models including those from the other global SIF communities as well as data from the numerous “alphabet soup” data initiatives that are populating the education landscape. In essence – education now can utilize “one wire with one plug” – not the never-ending proprietary API's and “one off” connections. The specification fully supports RESTful Web Services and SOAP-based protocols.

The Australian 3.4 Data Model specification had come out in Fall of 2016, as well as a 3.1.2 release of the Global SIF Infrastructure.

The version 2.8 specification is the last 2.x version of SIF. Most of the SIF implementations in the United States and abroad are 2.x deployments.

The A4L Community has just released a new version of the SIF Specification called "Unity" that will use the best objects from the 3.x specification and the foundation of the 2.8 specification, and be able to run on either the 3.x infrastructure or the 2.x infrastructure. This is a boon to the thousands of districts and many states using the SIF 2 infrastructure and allows a clean migration path to utilizing more modern RestFUL architectures if desired.

=== SIF Xpress ===
The SIF 3.2 Release includes the SIF XPress Roster and the SIF Xpress Student Record Exchange (SRE). These are the result of work being done by various members of the association (vendors, agencies, regional centers) on a more easily adopted, easier to implement sub-set of the specification that handles the roster and basic uses cases.

=== Privacy ===
The Access for Learning community has recently started taking strong leadership in the education Privacy space globally. The association has created and supports an organization called the Student Data Privacy Consortium, or SDPC. and working closely with national Australian privacy efforts

== See also ==
- Access For Learning Community
- Enterprise application integration
- Machine-readable document
- Open Knowledge Initiative
- SCORM
- Standard data model
- Shibboleth (Internet2)
- Web services
