= IBM WebSphere Service Registry and Repository =

Service registry

- Developer: IBM
- Initial release: 6.0 20 October 2006; 19 years ago
- Stable release: 8.5.6 / 30 October 2015; 10 years ago
- Written in: Java
- Operating system: AIX, Windows, Solaris, Linux, HP-UX, z/OS
- Platform: x86, x86-64, PowerPC, SPARC, IA-64, zSeries
- Available in: English, French, German, Brazilian-Portuguese, Czech, Hungarian, Italian, Japanese, Korean, Polish, Russian, Spanish, Simplified Chinese, Traditional Chinese
- Type: JEE Application
- License: Commercial
- Website: http://www-01.ibm.com/software/integration/wsrr/

IBM WebSphere Service Registry and Repository (WSRR) is a service registry for use in a service-oriented architecture. It runs as a Java Enterprise Application on IBM WebSphere Application Server.

It provides functionality to store and retrieve service-metadata. WSDL, XSD, SCA modules and policy documents can be loaded and parsed into separate entities. For example, with a WSDL document, separate entities are created for service, binding, portType. XML and binary documents can be loaded as single entities. These entities can then be decorated with additional data in the form of properties, classifications and relationships.

Classification systems defined in OWL are supported. Custom object types can be modelled in OWL such as service contracts, SLAs and SLDs.

Entities with the registry can be managed using life cycles defined in SACL in order to provide service governance. The life cycle can track the state of a service, for example through development, testing, QA, and production.

== APIs ==
The product has Web service, JEE EJB and ATOM/REST based APIs for accessing and manipulating data within the registry.

UDDI synchronisation can be enabled to provide integration with products supporting the UDDI v3 API.

=== Extension points ===
Validators, modifiers and notifiers are defined extension points (similar to a user exits) which allow a custom piece of code to be run within the product when an event occurs. This could be when an object is created, updated, or deleted, or when a transition occurs from one life cycle state to another.

== Integration ==
When combined with an ESB, can provide dynamic endpoint lookup so that services can be redirected based upon information retrieved from the registry. ESBs which include primitives to support this out of the box include DataPower, WESB and WebSphere Message Broker. Other ESBs can use one of the WSRR APIs to look up the endpoint information.

== Version history ==
=== Version 8.5.6 (October 2015) ===
This release added a user interface enhancement that enables users to display their REST services in a Swagger viewer, when they describe their REST services using Swagger 2.0.

Mediation runtime policy ordering allows WSRR, as the policy administration point, to specify the order in which Service Level Definition (SLD) policies are enforced in DataPower. Custom, runtime policy filters also provide WSRR the ability to insert custom message content filters (MCF) into the response to allow IBM's DataPower multi-protocol gateway (MPGW) to perform advanced functions.

IBM POWER8 supports Little-Endian on SUSE Linux, Red Hat Linux (RHEL), and Ubuntu operating systems.

Users can test their promotion configuration from the governance master to runtime before actually performing a promotion.

Users can download all relevant documents, including SOAP (WSDL) and REST (Swagger 2.0) service interfaces, as a single zip file.

The ability to insert a random UUID into any property by using the configurable modifier. Documentation is created regarding how to use the UUID to create context and consumer IDs when an SLA and version are created for a service.

The 8.5.6 release was a "mod pack" which means it can be applied as a fix pack to an existing 8.5 installation.

=== Version 8.5.5 (March 2015) ===
This release added user interface enhancements that enable:

- Simplified SOAP service registration by new wizards and a new editing User Interface.
- Simplified view of a service on one page, using tabs to show endpoints, interfaces, and details.
- Simplified registration of a consuming service or application, by a new wizard.

A bulk load tool which loads a spreadsheet containing service definitions into WSRR and creates the service definition objects in WSRR.

A simplified service management profile which reduces the steps in the life cycle for services, service level definitions and applications. The profile also has simplified labels for states of objects and transitions to move between states.

Simplified promotion process where all objects on the target system are updated when a promotion happens to that system, rather than the previous behavior.

Performance improvements when loading large (around 1 MB or larger) WSDL and XSD documents.

The 8.5.5 release was a "mod pack".

=== Version 8.5 (April 2014) ===
A faster and more simplified user interface that is self-contained within WebSphere Service Registry and Repository. Added support for the Google Chrome browser and the latest Mozilla Firefox and Microsoft Internet Explorer browser releases.

Usability enhancements that enable:

- Proactive consumer notification upon service change.
- Additional filter and download options
- Support for IBM Integration Bus (IIB) Work Load Management (WLM) policy specification and management for usage with IIB objects modeled in WebSphere Service Registry and Repository (for example, services and workflows)

=== Version 8.0 (June 2012) ===
Includes improved Business Space widgets including document loading, and impact analysis. New Business Space templates for operations and development, and government enablement enhancements for modelling REST services. API Enhancements for REST. Enforcement of Service Level Agreements with DataPower.

=== Version 7.5 (June 2011) ===
This release added improved UI Business Space widgets. Report hosting and activity monitoring from the UI. Full text search capability (based on Apache Lucene technology). The WSRR studio configuration tool has additional functionality to make configuration quicker, including click-to-assign lifecycles, an access control editor, and governance policy authoring. Upgrade performance has been improved. SCA service endpoints have been added to allow governance.

=== Version 7.0 (Nov 2009) ===
This release added Integration with Tivoli Change and Control Management Database, Name Queries, Business Space User Interface, ATOM support with ATOM classification and Configuration APIs further SCA bindings. Feature Packs with Service Federation Management (SFM) and further Business Space enhancements are available.

=== Version 6.3 (June 2009) ===
This release added Websphere Service Registry and Repository Studio application for manipulating models and LIfe cycles using UML tooling. Service Discovery extended to Oracle WebLogic Server and JBoss Application Server. The Governance Enablement Profile was introduced which contains models, life cycles and support for best practices when governing Services using WSRR. An Advanced LifeCycle Edition offers Integration with Rational Asset Manager.

=== Version 6.2 (Jul 2008) ===
Policy Management introduced including support for Policy Authoring, Policy definition to create and update policies for an extensible set of SOA policy domains, Web services interoperability (WS-I) compliance for standards-based interoperability policies. Service Discovery from Oracle Application Server and Service Discovery framework to allow plugins to be developed for discovery from any target environment.

=== Version 6.1 (Dec 2007) ===
This release added Deployment Wizard, Graphical view of objects and relationships, Business modelling allowing you to represent the custom objects, Service Discovery, Scheduler framework, WSDL Parser Extension plugins, promotion, faceted search, auto suggest, REST interface and a governance profile.

=== Version 6.0.2 (May 2007) ===
This release added UDDI Integration, Clustering Support, business Profile, configuration profiles, binary document support, Policy support Extensions, Load Documents Wizard, Binary Document Support, Eclipse User Interface, email notification Service.

=== Version 6.0 (Sept 2006) ===
Initial release. Basic support for WSDL, XSD with a Web UI. Allows adding of properties, relationships and classifications.

== Websites claiming or suggesting that WebSphere Service Registry and Repository is a notable piece of software ==
- Cnet
- SAP
- zdnet
- ebizq
