= E-Biz Integrator =

Skyricher

e-Biz Integrator is a middleware software package for enterprise application integration, that first became available in 1999. It links applications with servers and includes features for routing data, messaging transport, and a formatting module for data transformation. It was developed by NEON (New Era of Networks) Inc. for large scale Windows NT, Windows 2000 and UNIX-based enterprises, then NEON was acquired by Sybase in 2001 for US$370 million. In 2002, Forrester Research gave e-Biz Integrator a poor rating for complex integration projects because of the lack of core security features and mature tools for processing. Sybase stopped offering this product in 2004.
