= Information silo =

Insular information management system

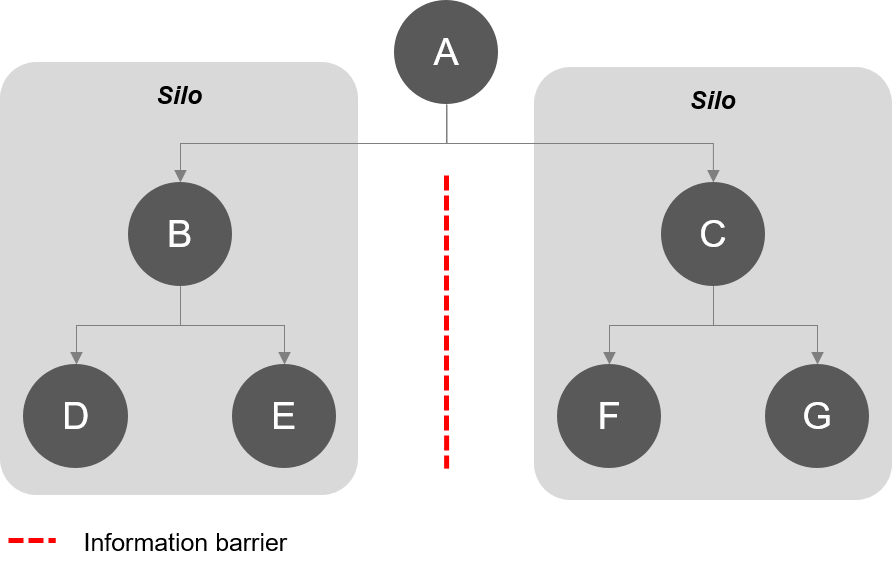
Typical information silos in a hierarchic structured organization

An information silo, or a group of such silos, is an insular management system in which one information system or subsystem is incapable of reciprocal operation with others that are, or should be, related. Thus information is not adequately shared but rather remains sequestered within each system or subsystem, figuratively trapped within a container as grain is trapped within a silo: there may be much of it, and it may be stacked quite high and be freely available within those limits, but it has no effect outside them.

Information silos occur whenever a data system is incompatible, or not integrated, with other data systems. This incompatibility may occur in the technical architecture, in the application architecture, or in the data architecture of a data system. Such data silos are proving an obstacle for businesses wishing to use data mining to make productive use of their data. However, since it has been shown that established data-modeling methods are the root cause of the data-integration problem, most data systems are at least incompatible in the data-architecture layer.

== In organizations ==
In understanding organizational behaviour, the term silo mentality often refers to a mindset which creates and maintains information silos within an organization. A silo mentality is created by the divergent goals of different organizational units: it is defined by the Business Dictionary as "a mindset present when certain departments or sectors do not wish to share information with others in the same company". It can also be described as a variant of the principal–agent problem.

A silo mentality primarily occurs in larger organizations and can lead to poorer performance and has a negative impact on the corporate culture. Silo mentalities can be countered by the introduction of shared goals, the increase of internal networking activities and the flattening of hierarchies.

Predictors for the occurrence of silos include:

- Number of employees
- Number of organizational units within the whole organization
- Degree of specialization
- Number of different incentive mechanisms.

Gleeson and Rozo suggest that

The silo mindset does not appear accidentally ... more often than not, silos are the result of a conflicted leadership team ... A unified leadership team will encourage trust, create empowerment, and break managers out of their "my department" mentality and into the "our organization" mentality.

== Etymology ==
The term functional silo syndrome was coined in 1988 by Phil S. Ensor (1931–2018) who worked in organizational development and employee relations for Goodyear Tire and Rubber Company and Eaton Corporation, and as a consultant. Silo and stovepipe (as in "stovepipe organization" and "stovepipe system") are now used interchangeably and applied broadly. Phil Ensor's use of the term silo reflects his rural Illinois origins and the many grain silos he would pass on return visits as he contemplated the challenges of the modern organizations with which he worked.

== See also ==
- Bounded rationality – Making of satisfactory, not optimal, decisions
- Business process interoperability
- Closed platform – System where a single company controls an entire ecosystem (also called walled garden or closed ecosystem)
- Data architecture – Standards on data collection and storage
- Data integration – Combining data from multiple sources
- Data warehouse – Centralized storage of knowledge
- Disparate system – Data processing system without interaction with other computer data processing systems
- Enterprise application integration – Use of software for integration
- Filter bubble – Intellectual isolation through internet algorithms
- Islands of automation – Automation architecture term
- Metadata publishing
