= Surgical scheduling software =

Surgical scheduling software is computer software related to scheduling of tasks for a sequence of surgical cases in one surgery theatre and with one surgery staff using an operational model, a computer and a network. Another vital part of the surgery scheduling process is the communication between the Facility and the Vendor.

Applications may cover platforms that include the traditional (legacy) software-based system of operations or networked server systems. Other approaches are services as with cloud computing includes software as a service (SaaS) and platform as a service (PaaS) systems.

== Historical procedures and limitations of surgery scheduling ==
The integration of modern communications into the healthcare world has been strongly retarded by the reluctance of the surgeons to organise their work as a service in a production site. However all requirements to be fulfilled for proper performing and high efficiency recommend such approach.

Healthcare IT was focused solely on using and upgrading technology dedicated to research, treatment, and diagnostics.

In the old style schedulers would send paper schedules via fax machine (as often required by hospitals) or call participants using the telephone.

As long as schedulers depended on phones and fax machines to send and receive confirmations, vital time was often spent waiting for information. Unreliable systems and confirmation methods also led to cancelled surgeries and lost revenue.

Administrative tasks, which had long since been automated in other industries, did not utilize technology to the fullest.

=== Prerequisites to improve ===
A single surgery requires the participation and collaboration of multiple parties: patient, surgeon, support staff (such as anesthesiologist), and device representative. Coordinating and confirming these parties is the responsibility of the surgical administrator's office.

Surgery scheduling, therefore, may be implemented based on software resources that is readily available to schedulers and administrators from production and other service industry in a surgical practice. However the prerequisite is some standard in the applied surgery procedures, that provides time estimates for the operation in the surgery theatre and for the respective preparations before and after the invention in each patient's case.

=== US approaches to improve with healthcare administrators ===
As part of the American Recovery and Reinvestment Act of 2009 (ARRA), the Federal government set aside over $20 billion of stimulus money to promote healthcare IT solutions. These funds were for "meaningful use" situations that included electronic health records (EHR) and other means to make healthcare more efficient, competitive, and affordable.

The increased awareness of streamlined processes was one of the first steps to the introduction of new IT tools to the healthcare field that had previously been employed in other industries.

== Classes of Solutions ==
The recommendations given with US NIH National Center for Health Statistics (NCHS) standard ICD-10-PCS procedure coding system offer a basic ontology for modeling the surgery processes. The current intention for retrospective statistical purposes does not prevent from perspective application for management purposes.

However the adoption for the entire location requires mirroring the team set-ups and the local resources as available. Respective modeling of standard surgical intervention is required to compose the model for sequencing several cases and respective intervention in one shift of a team.

=== Legacy approaches for sole work positions ===
The first type of solution to be offered to the healthcare IT world was the traditional, legacy software system. These applications, often part of a larger enterprise system, allow schedulers to use email and contact management processes.

The surgical scheduling software is installed on a specific computer and is available to one or more users within the practice.

=== Server based solutions and web based solutions ===
Server based solutions may be seen as an intermediate step to allow surgical schedulers to tap into the power and convenience of the World Wide Web. These software as a service (SaaS) solutions are hosted on servers accessible via the Internet. The data and capabilities of the software are easily manageable from standard Internet connections or wireless devices such as laptops or smartphones. However minimum data security is not available for free with such approaches.

== Adoption in the US ==
"Meaningful use" has resulted in a drastic increase in Electronic Health Records (EHR) systems being implemented in surgical practices across the US. Many of these systems have various features that help automate some tasks involved in the surgical scheduling process. However, EHR systems are not surgical scheduling solutions. They are primarily designed to manage the clinical data for surgery. There are very few dedicated surgical scheduling software vendors in the US.

== Consolidation ==
Surgical scheduling software and online surgical scheduling tools have revolutionized the way surgical cases are managed. Schedulers can now instantly send case details to every participant on their list. The software enables recipients to respond with the touch of a button and perform other functions such as adding the schedule to their calendars. What used to take hours or days on the fax machine and phone now takes mere seconds.

In addition to the quick response time, users are also able to generate reports that help manage the practice. With a cloud system, all of the information is securely stored in the central server database and is accessible via password. Online surgical scheduling is relatively new to the surgery scheduling scene, but is quickly becoming mainstream.
