= Integration appliance =

An integration appliance is a computer system specifically designed to lower the cost of integrating computer systems. Most integration appliances send or receive electronic messages from other computers that are exchanging electronic documents. Most Integration Appliances support XML messaging standards such as SOAP and Web services are frequently referred to as XML appliances and perform functions that can be grouped together as XML-Enabled Networking.

== Vendors providing integration appliances ==
- DataPower XI50 and IBM MQ Appliance — IBM
- Intel SOA Products Division
- Premier, Inc.
