= Open service interface definition =

An open service interface definition (OSID) is a programmatic interface specification describing a service. These interfaces are specified by the Open Knowledge Initiative (OKI) to implement a service-oriented architecture (SOA) to achieve interoperability among applications across a varied base of underlying and changing technologies.

== Rationale ==
To preserve the investment in software engineering, program logic is separated from underlying technologies through the use of software interfaces each of which defines a contract between a service consumer and a service provider. This separation is the basis of any valid SOA. While some methods define the service interface boundary at a protocol or server level, OSIDs place the boundary at the application level to effectively insulate the consumer from protocols, server identities, and utility libraries that are in the domain to a service provider resulting in software which is easier to develop, longer-lasting, and usable across a wider array of computing environments.

OSIDs assist in software design and development by breaking up the problem space across service interface boundaries. Because network communication issues are addressed within a service provider and below the interface, there isn't an assumption that every service provider implement a remote communications protocol (though many do). OSIDs are also used for communication and coordination among the various components of complex software which provide a means of organizing design and development activities for simplified project management.

OSID providers (implementations) are often reused across a varied set of applications. Once software is made to understand the interface contract for a service, other compliant implementations may be used in its place. This achieves reusability at a high level (a service level) and also serves to easily scale software written for smaller more dedicated purposes.

An OSID provider implementation may be composed of an arbitrary number of other OSID providers. This layering technique is an obvious means of abstraction. When all the OSID providers implement the same service, this is called an adapter pattern. Adapter patterns are powerful techniques to federate, multiplex, or bridge different services contracting from the same interface without the modification to the application.

== List ==
- Agent
- Assessment
- Authentication
- Authorization
- CourseManagement
- Dictionary
- Filing
- Grading
- Hierarchy
- Logging
- Messaging
- Repository
- Scheduling
- Workflow
