= Disparate system =

Data processing system without interaction with other computer data processing systems

In information technology, a disparate system or a disparate data system is a computer data processing system that was designed to operate as a fundamentally distinct data processing system without exchanging data or interacting with other computer data processing systems. Legacy systems are examples of disparate data systems, as are heterogeneous database data systems. A disparate system is often characterized as an information silo because of the data system's isolation from or incompatibility with any other data systems.

== Overview ==
Each data system may be envisioned as being composed of a software layer or applications architecture, a data layer or data architecture, and a data processing environment layer or technical architecture. Any of these three layers may contribute to forming a disparate data system.

== See also ==
- Enterprise application integration – Use of software for integration
- Data warehouse – Centralized storage of knowledge
- Information silo – Insular information management system
