= Sarvega =

XML appliance company acquired by Intel in 2005

Sarvega, Inc.
- Type: Subsidiary
- Industry: Software, Network appliances
- Defunct: 2005
- Fate: Acquired by Intel
- Parent: Intel (from 2005)

Sarvega, Inc. was a software and hardware company that produced XML appliances — network devices designed to accelerate and secure XML-based web services traffic. The company was acquired by Intel in 2005 and integrated into Intel's Software and Services Group (SSG).

== History ==
Sarvega developed XPE Switches, a line of XML processing appliances that offloaded XML parsing, transformation, validation and security enforcement from application servers — a valuable capability during the SOA and web services expansion of the early 2000s. Customers using Sarvega XPE Switches included Fujitsu and health care system Mt. Sinai Hospital Systems. The company was also developing security appliances for XML policy enforcement.

Intel's acquisition of Sarvega was announced on 17 August 2005, adding XML processing capabilities to Intel's software portfolio. The company was incorporated into Intel's Software and Services Group.

== See also ==
- XML appliance
