= Industry standard data model =

An industry standard data model, or simply standard data model, is a data model that is widely used in a particular industry. The use of standard data models makes the exchange of information easier and faster because it allows heterogeneous organizations to share an agreed vocabulary, semantics, format, and quality standard for data. Organizations may save time and expense by using pre-existing data models instead of developing them in-house, although the process of making data conform to external models can also be a hindrance.

Standards are often defined by standards bodies or technology companies.

Most models use the relational model of database management, but some use the hierarchical model, especially those used in manufacturing or those mandated by governments, such as models specified by DIN codes in Germany.

== Applications ==
Effective standard models have developed in the banking, insurance, pharmaceutical and automotive industries. These models reflect stringent standards required in these industries for customer information gathering, customer privacy, consumer safety, or just in time manufacturing.

The most complex data models known are in military use. Consortia such as NATO tend to require strict standards for their members' equipment and supply databases. While standards for commercial software are usually open to view and implement, military data standards are often private and internal.

== Issues ==
Standard data models usually require the translation of existing company data to fit the model's specification, which may cost more than is gained by the use of such a model. Inflexible models might not be able to capture all of the data of a given organization, or new types of data that arise as an organization or industry develops. If one organization needs to make changes to its software architecture that are not compatible with the current standard, it may cause data sharing issues.

== Examples ==
- ISO 10303 CAE Data Exchange Standard - includes its own data modelling language, EXPRESS
- ISO 15926 Process Plants including Oil and Gas facilities Life-Cycle data
- IDEAS Group Foundation Ontology agreed by defence departments of Australia, Canada, France, Sweden, UK and USA
- EN12896 CEN Reference Data Model For Public Transport. covering public transport scheduling, fare management, operations and passenger information
- Seabed Survey Data Model (SSDM) is a standard data model used in the oil and gas industry, first introduced in 2011.
- Common Education Data Standards (CEDS) is a data dictionary standard model sponsored by the U.S. government that is used widely in the United States education system
- SIF is an interoperability specification used as a standard data model in Australia, the UK, and the US.

== See also ==
- Common data model
- Reference model
- Conceptual schema
- Technical standard
- International standard
- Data governance
