= Application retirement =

Application retirement, also called application decommissioning and application sunsetting, is the practice of shutting down redundant or obsolete business applications while retaining access to the historical data. Legacy applications are often maintained solely to provide infrequent or sporadic access to data within the application database for regulatory or business purposes. With some organizations spending upwards of 75% of their application software budgets on ongoing maintenance, application retirement can deliver significant cost savings.

The act of application retirement usually involves migrating data from the legacy application database to another data repository or archive store that can be accessed independently using industry standard reporting or business intelligence tools. Application retirement allows IT departments within companies to reduce the software, hardware and resources required to manage legacy data.

== See also ==
- End-of-life (product)
- Software release life cycle
