= IBM WebSphere Service Registry and Repository Feature Pack for Service Federation Management =

IBM WebSphere Service Registry and Repository Feature Pack for Service Federation Management is IBM's implementation of the Service Federation Management concept. It provides an interface within Business Space. Users can specify how services to be shared between multiple and separate business units.

== Components ==
The IBM Service Federation Management application is a feature pack of WebSphere Service Registry and Repository V7.0 and V7.5.

The Feature pack provides a GUI interface within Business Space in which such domains can be accessed. Service endpoints can then be grouped for sharing. The groups can then be shared between domains in a federation. Additional qualities of service can be added by defining service proxies that are automatically deployed as part of the operation of creating a share.

It encompasses three components: a federation model, a protocol, and a console.

== Requirements ==
IBM Service Federation Management is a feature pack of IBM WSRR. Therefore, IBM WSRR V7.0 or V7.5 must be available.

== How IBM Service Federation Management works ==
The Service Federation Manager uses a console to provide interfaces to available services.

Authorization needs to be set up so that SFM can access the required service providers.

Service documents are loaded from the providers of a service. These represent connectivity providers, domains servers, registries servers and federation servers.

Domains are created on a domain server to represent each of the service domains provided by that server. Service Groups are created to contain services endpoints. These endpoints can therefore be grouped together to ease the process of sharing.

A federation is created on a federation server to link together domains. The domains can then be connected to map a Service Group from one domain to another, allowing a consumer to make use of a provider's services. At this stage the additional qualities of service are set up, such as authentication of services and the validation of messages. The use of proxies by domains is partly determined by these selections and also partly by the user's own selection.

Thus a Share is set up between the two domains determining which services are to be shared, and with what properties. Proxies are created on either end of the share if they are required (and only if they are required) to support the properties that have been selected.

== User Interfaces ==
The user interface of IBM SFM consists of a GUI that is run inside Business Space. Different tabs allow the user to work with the administration, the domain management and the federation management of the system.
