= Common Education Data Standards =

The Common Education Data Standards (CEDS) project is a United States national collaborative effort to develop voluntary, common data standards for a key set of education data elements to streamline the exchange, comparison, and understanding of data within and across P-20W institutions and sectors. CEDS includes a common vocabulary for data elements, data models that reflect that vocabulary, variety of tools to understand and use education data, an assembly of metadata from other education data initiatives, and a community of stakeholders who use, support, and develop the standard.

== See also ==
- Schools Interoperability Framework
- Standard data model
