= XML appliance =

Computer network device

An XML appliance is a special-purpose network device used to secure, manage and mediate XML traffic. They are most popularly implemented in service-oriented architectures (SOA) to control XML-based web services traffic, and increasingly in cloud-oriented computing to help enterprises integrate on premises applications with off-premises cloud-hosted applications. XML appliances are also commonly referred to as SOA appliances, SOA gateways, XML gateways, and cloud brokers. Some have also been deployed for more specific applications like Message-oriented middleware. While the originators of the product category deployed exclusively as hardware, today most XML appliances are also available as software gateways and virtual appliances for environments like VMWare.

== History of XML appliances ==
The first XML appliances were created by DataPower and Vordel in 1999, Sarvega in 2000, Forum Systems in 2001, Managed Methods in 2005 and Layer 7 Technologies in 2002. Early vendors like DataPower focused on the XML acceleration problem which they solved through specialized hardware. While several vendors like DataPower (purchased by IBM in 2005) and Layer 7 Technologies continue to offer hardware accelerated options for high performance situations, advances in computing speed has made software or vmware based "appliances" practical in many common customer situations. Early use cases for XML appliances included banking and cross-agency government information sharing. Today XML appliances are widely used across finance, telecommunications, government, energy, logistics commensurate with the growing usage of XML as a cross-division and cross-company data exchange protocol.

In 2005, XML appliances (or SOA appliances, as they came to be known) became increasingly associated with service-oriented architectures and more specifically the problem of governing SOA. The governance of SOA comes down to the control of how applications delivered as "services" can be shared with or called by other applications. Appliances became a popular way of controlling or governing SOA because addressed message security, availability and translation of data so that an application can call another application irrespective of the data format and security policies. Governance of SOA became so critical that Gartner published a dedicated Integrated SOA Governance Technology Sets Magic Quadrant on the topic that covered both SOA management and SOA appliances in March 2007 and most recently in March 2009.

== Use cases of XML appliances ==
- High-speed transformation and processing of XML traffic
- Security and governance of service-oriented architectures or SOA
- Control of web application APIs that are commonly today exposed as XML-based REST interfaces
- Integration of enterprise applications to services hosted in the cloud

== Common features of XML appliances ==
- They can parse, validate, transform and route XML messages via XPath and XSLT
- They can control access to applications that expose data and functionality through XML APIs
- They can control SLAs for how XML-based services get shared with other applications
- They can track XML traffic and usage of specific application services exposed through XML interfaces

== Classification of XML appliances ==
Although the term XML appliance is the most general term to describe these devices, most vendors use alternative terminology that describe more specific functionality of these devices. The following are alternative names used for XML appliances:

- XML accelerators — are devices that typically use custom hardware or software built on standards-based hardware to accelerate XPath processing. This hardware typically provides a performance boost between 10 and 100 times in the number of messages per second that can be processed.
- Integration appliance — (also known as application routers) are devices that are designed to make the integration of computer systems easier.
- XML firewalls are classes of XML appliances focused on identity and message security. They typically implement WS-Security message standards along with standards like SAML, WS-I BSP, WS-Policy and so forth.
- Message-oriented middleware appliances - are hardware devices supporting the sending and receiving of messages between distributed systems.
- SOA Gateways are commonly used to govern SOA traffic.
- API proxies are commonly used to manage Web APIs.
- Cloud brokers or gateways are commonly used to integrate enterprise applications with cloud services.

== See also ==
- SOAP
- WS-Security
- Apache Axis
- Integration appliance
- Message-oriented middleware
