= Task computing =

Task computing is a computation meant to fill the gap between tasks (what the user wants to be done) and services (functionalities that are available to the user). Task computing seeks to redefine how users interact with and use computing environments. It is built on pervasive computing.

== Task Computing Framework (TCF) and Task Computing Environment (TCE) ==
A Task Computing Framework (TCF) is a framework that supports task computing, by providing support for:

- The workflows of task computing, i.e., at a minimum, discovery, followed by composition and execution
- Semantic description of tasks and services
- Specification, execution, and re-usability of tasks by end users
- Manipulation, including creation and disposal of services by end users

This definition of a task computing framework does not make reference to computational components. This is referred to as a Task Computing Environment (TCE). A TCE is a computational system that includes, at a minimum, the following components:

- One or more Task Computing Clients (TCCs),
- One or more Semantically Described Services (SDSs),
- One or more Semantic Service Discovery Mechanisms (SSDMs), and
- Optionally, one or more Service Controls (SCs)

== Applications ==
Using Task Execution EditoR (STEER), embodiments of multiple semantically described services and service controls, the following applications are possible:

- Exchanging Business Cards
- Showing and Sharing the Presentation
- Scheduling a Future Presentation
- Checking and Printing Directions to the Airport

== Related work ==
- White Hole
- PIPE (Pervasive Instance Provision Environment)
