= Access For Learning Community =

Not-for-profit corporation

- Founded: 1997
- Type: Corporation (not-for-profit)
- Location: Washington, D.C., US
- Website: a4l.org

Access for Learning Community, or A4L, is a global, not-for-profit corporation which supports the use of standards by schools, districts, states, countries, and education vendors. It has regional chapters in the US, UK, AU, and New Zealand.

It was formerly known as the Schools Interoperability Framework Association, or SIFA. The name was changed in May 2015.

A4L members collaborate on a variety of technical standards sometimes collectively known as the Schools Interoperability Framework (SIF). A4L publishes these standards.

The organization includes more than 1000 members as of 2015.

== History ==
A4L was founded as a working group for the Schools Interoperability Framework in 1997 by vendors with the support of the Software and Information Industry Association (SIIA). In April 2003, SIFA was incorporated with it. On May 20, 2015 the name of the organization was changed to the Access For Learning Community.

== See also ==
- Schools Interoperability Framework
