= Sweden India Film Association =

Sweden India Film Association, or SIFA, is an independent organisation dedicated to promoting the cultural and financial exchange between the Swedish and the Indian film industries.

== History ==
SIFA was founded by Ms Kunnie (Kunzang) Topden and Mr Christer Holmgren in 2004. The project has been fruitful, as SIFA was instrumental in arranging the first shooting of an Indian film ever on Swedish soil, Romesh Sharma's Follow Your Heart (Dil Jo Bhi Kahe). Since then SIFA has arranged a film festival in Stockholm, guested by among others Dev Anand, and is currently working to realize more Indian shoots in Sweden and Scandinavia.
