= Stovepipe organisation =

Type of organisational structure

A stovepipe organisation has a structure that largely or entirely restricts the flow of information within the organisation to up-down through lines of control, inhibiting or preventing cross-organisational communication. Many traditional, large (especially governmental or transnational) organisations have (or risk having) a stovepipe pattern. Intelligence organisations may deliberately adopt a stovepipe pattern so that a breach or compromise in one area cannot easily spread to others. A famous example of this is Bletchley Park (an allied forces Second World War codebreaking centre where messages encrypted by the Enigma machine were decrypted) where people working in one hut would not know what the people in any other hut did.

A stovepipe pattern is most likely to develop in organisations that have some or all of the following characteristics:

- Very hierarchical with sharply defined roles or areas of influence (e.g. regional sales teams)
- Long reporting lines (i.e. many intermediary layers of management) and narrow spans of control (each manager only has a small number of direct reports)
- Departmental organisation of information technology, human resources and similar functions, especially where applications and services are procured departmentally rather than via a central procurement section
- Culture of suspicion or a dictatorial management style
- Multiple sites (or sub-sites within a larger site) where staff have little chance to interact on a regular basis with staff from another site
- Formed by the merger of two organisations or the acquisition of one organisation by another

A stovepipe pattern can be very harmful to a commercial organisation as it can lead to duplication of effort in different parts of the organisation and, in extreme cases, unhealthy competition between different branches of the organisation.

Strategies to avoid this can include:

- Centralisation of information technology, human resources, procurement and similar functions
- Short reporting lines
- Decentralised cross functional teams for executing one-time projects and ongoing operations
- Fewer sites or movement of staff between sites
- Increased mobility of staff between teams to promote individual and organisational breadth
- Culture of openness and supportive management style driven from the senior management
- Rapid integration of staff after a merger or acquisition

== See also ==
- Information silo
- Mushroom management
- Stovepipe system
- Compartmentalisation
