= Stochastic Signal Density Modulation =

Modulation technique for LED power control

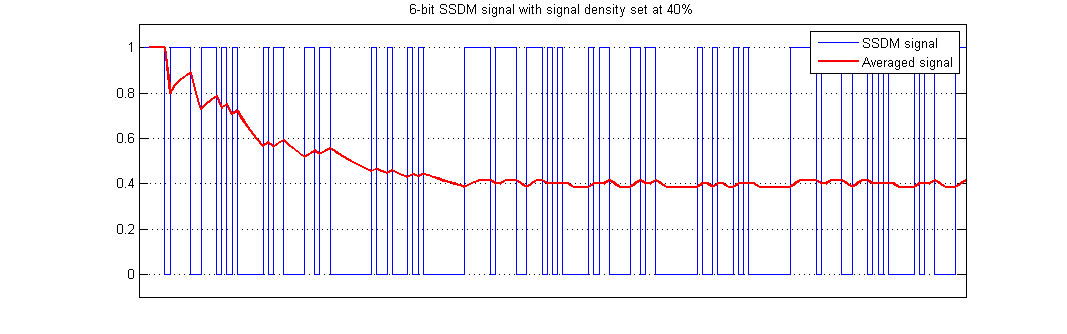
Figure 1: sample SSDM signal with average.

Stochastic Signal Density Modulation (SSDM) is a novel power modulation technique primarily used for LED power control. The information is encoded - or the power level is set - using pulses that have pseudo-random widths. The pulses are produced so that, on average, the produced signal will have the desired ratio between high and low states. The main benefit of using SSDM over, for example, Pulse-width modulation (PWM), which is usually the preferred method for controlling LED power, is reduced electromagnetic interference. Figure 1 illustrates a SSDM signal and demonstrates how the average signal density approaches desired value. The pseudo-random pulses in the signal are visible.

SSDM can be seen as a special case of Pulse-density modulation (PDM) or Random Pulse Width Modulation (RPWM).

== Principle and signal creation ==
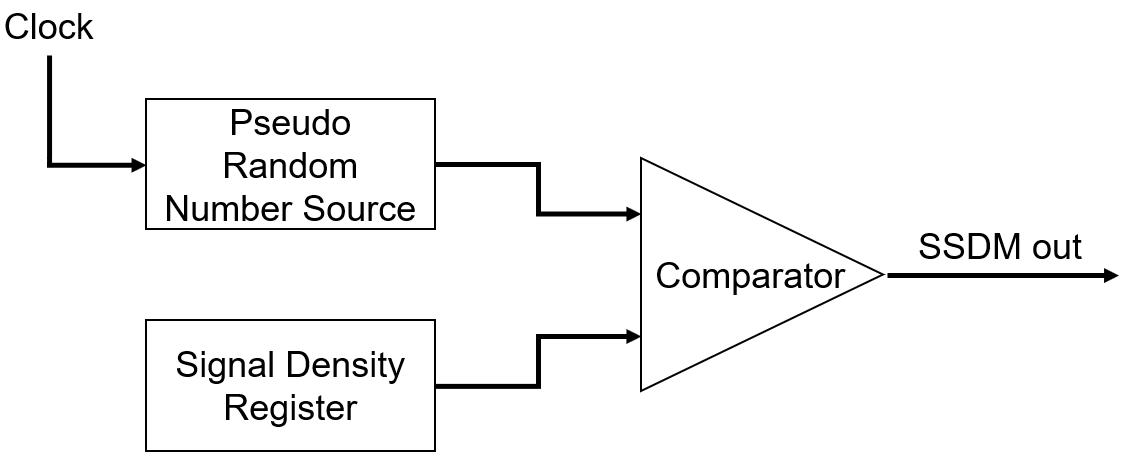
Figure 2: SSDM generation block diagram.

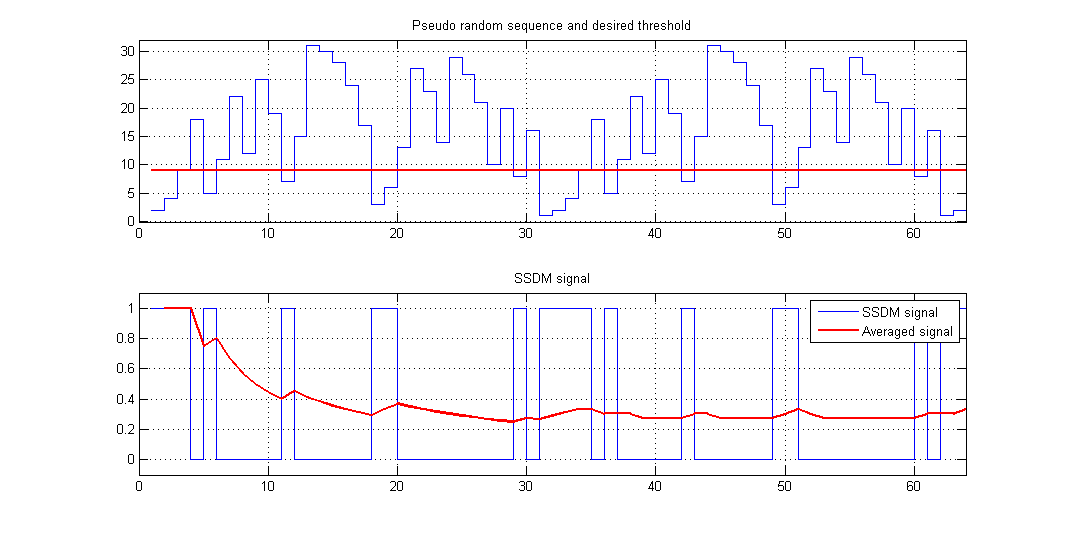
Figure 3: creation of 5-bit SSDM signal with 30% signal density.

Producing an SSDM signal requires a Linear-feedback shift register (LFSR) or similar source providing a sequence of pseudo-random numbers, a signal density register, and a comparator. On each clock cycle, the LFSR provides one pseudo-random number. This is compared against the signal density register. The output is set to high if the signal density register is lower than the generated pseudo-random number. If the signal density register is higher than the generated pseudo-random number, the output is low. This is illustrated in figure 2.

When LFSR is used to provide pseudo-random numbers with a maximum possible period, the sequence will contain each of the numbers in the range once (except the zero) and eventually repeat. For a 4-bit LFSR the sequence is [1 2 5 3 7 6 4]. If the signal density register would be set to 3, would the corresponding SSDM signal be repeating the [1 1 0 1 0 0 0] pattern?

Figure 3 demonstrates the signal generation process. The generated sequence of pseudo-random numbers is shown in the first sub-plot and a desired 30% threshold. The lower plot is the produced SSDM signal. It can be seen that the output is high only when the generated pseudo-random numbers are at or below the desired threshold. The SSDM signal will average at 30% of the maximum. Also, the repetitive nature of LFSR is visible in the pseudo-random number sequence and the resulting SSDM signal.

== Comparison against other modulation methods ==
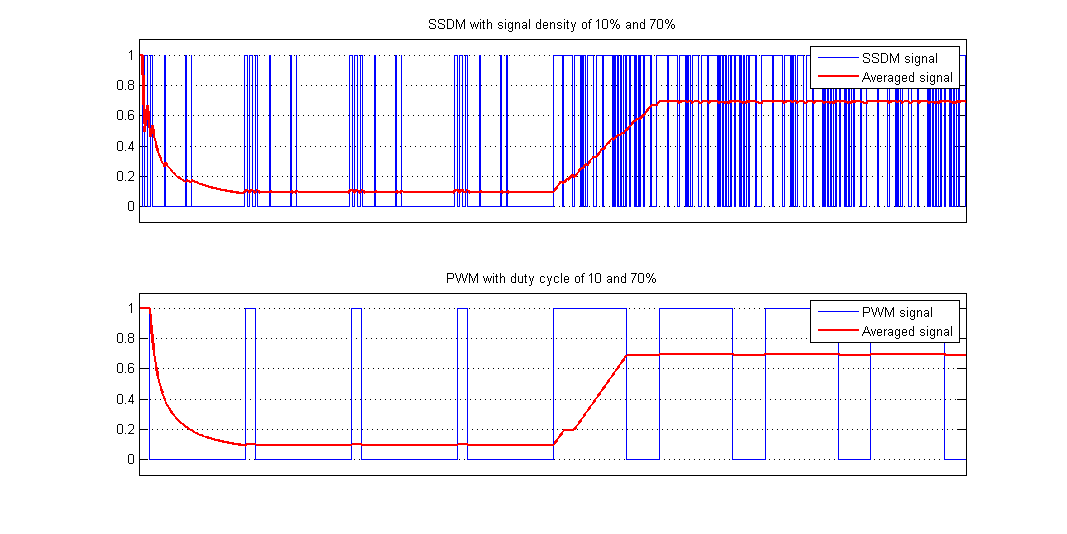
Figure 4: SSDM and PWM signals compared

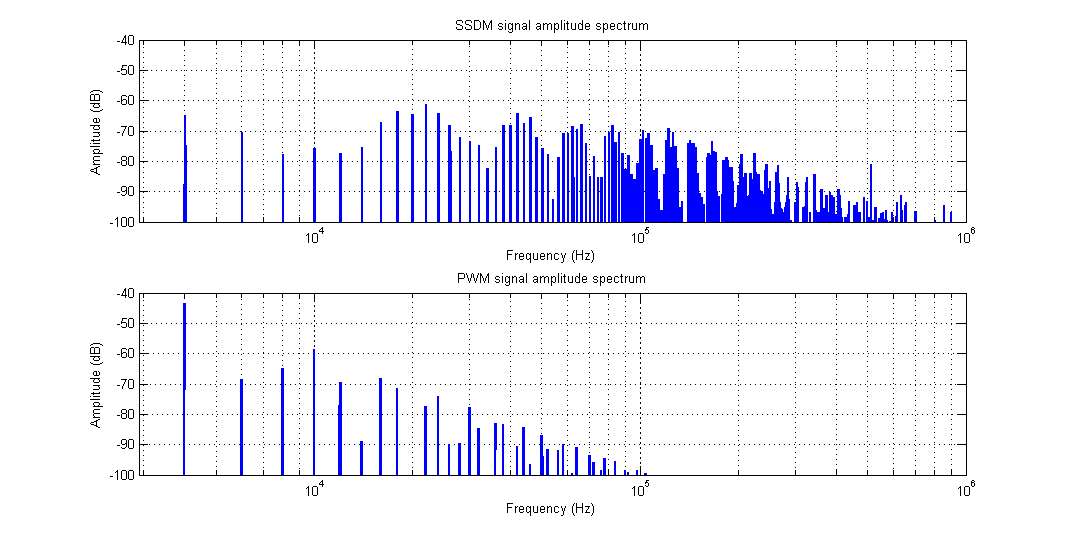
Figure 5: Amplitude spectrum of simulated SSDM and PWM signals

SSDM has significant advantages over PWM when used for power control. In the PWM signal, the frequency at which the output is turned high is constant. Only the width of the pulses is varied. This results in relatively high electromagnetic interference amplitude. In the case of SSDM, as the pulse widths and intervals are not constant, the resulting interference is spread across a wider spectrum, reducing the overall interference amplitude.

The fundamentally different operational principles of SSDM and PWM are illustrated in figure 4. Both signals are shown with two different signal density or pulse-width ratios: 10% and 70%.

Figure 5 illustrates the simulated spectrum of SSDM signal compared to PWM. Both are set to 30% signal density or pulse width and operate on the same frequency. As it can be seen, the amplitude on the lowest frequency component in SSDM is attenuated by more than 20 dB. This also demonstrates that for SSDM most of the signal energy is shifted to higher frequencies.. Some sources cite attenuation of 30 dB

However, due to the higher frequencies present in the signal, the SSDM may demand more from the load-driving circuitry than PWM. If there is any filtering present in the SSDM signal to reduce the higher frequency components, may this also affect the signal density. It's also worth noting that the increased number of individual transitions may also increase the switching losses on the MOSFETs used.

Like PWM, Delta-sigma modulation (DSM) produces far higher amplitude on the fundamental frequency and for the four following harmonics than SSDM.

== Practical implementation ==
=== Hardware support ===
The SSDM technology is patented by Cypress Semiconductor. Hence the microcontrollers supporting SSDM signal generation using dedicated hardware modules are PSoC devices from Cypress Semiconductor. SSDM module is available in PSoC 1 series devices. With PSoC series 3, 4 and 5 Precision Illumination Signal Modulation (PrISM) modules can be used. PrISM is interchangeable for SSDM.

While it is recognized in US Patent 8129924 that one practical option in a signal generation is using CPLD or FPGA devices, as of October 2017, no such implementations are publicly disclosed.

=== Considerations ===
When creating an SSDM signal, regardless of the method (HW, FPGA, Software), some consideration should be put on the frequency at which the signal is created and the other circuitry:

- The lowest frequency the signal created will have is determined by the frequency at which the LFSR creates random numbers and the desired resolution as follows: $F_\text{out} = \frac{F_\text{LFSR}}{2^n-1}$.
- When SSDM is used for LED power control, the driving frequency should be higher than the Flicker_fusion_threshold. For PrISM technology, 120 Hz minimum frequency on the output should be sufficient to avoid visible flicker. 300 Hz to guarantee flicker-free operation.
- When the frequency of the SSDM signal increases, so does the number of high-frequency components. This may affect the output-driving circuitry, and in some cases, filtering may occur. Filtering may affect the resulting pulse density.
- Some implementations do demonstrate the use of a low-pass filter that is set to filter the higher part of the frequencies in the SSDM signal.
- The use of SSDM may increase switching losses.
- The impact of the higher frequency components in the SSDM signal on other systems should be analyzed.

== See also ==
- Pulse-width modulation
- Pulse-density modulation
- Electromagnetic interference
