= Seabed Survey Data Model =

The Seabed Survey Data Model (SSDM) is an industry standard data model for how seabed survey data is stored and managed by oil and gas companies. The International Association of Oil & Gas Producers (IOGP) developed and published this standard in October 2011. Many surveys have been successfully delivered in SSDM.

The SSDM template is provided as an Esri ArcGIS geodatabase, but other implementations of the model are allowed.

== Significance ==
Outputs of seabed surveys usually contain CAD files, log imagery, surface grids and many other documents. Such a mix of data types makes the task of integrating existing enterprise data very complicated. Data models that were used by survey contractors before SSDM include ArcGIS Pipeline Data Model (APDM) and Professional Petroleum Data Management (PPDM). It is very difficult for both of these data models to manage their internal data. To fix this specific problem, IOGP defined the SSDM to better manage the data.

SSDM provides a complete survey data management workflow with improved integration with geoscience software. It is an industry data model that comes with complete software support that survey contractors can use. It enables the simple exchange of seabed survey data between two partners. Exploration and production companies may also extend the data model to fulfill their specific requirements.

== Area of application ==
As of today, the main area of the SSDM's application includes:

1. Sweep and bathymetric surveys (sonar scan and multi-beam)
2. Platform and drilling hazard site surveys
3. Pipeline route surveys

SSDM is currently not capable of doing ROV-based pipeline inspection surveys. That is the domain of the existing data model such as APDM and PPDM. However, this will not be a limitation of SSDM, because SSDM is expected to be used in conjunction with existing data models to capture the full range of acquired data and referenced data sets.

== Conceptual model ==
The conceptual model is a powerful idea of SSDM; it is used to help people know, understand, and simulate what SSDM represents. SSDM's conceptual model includes class, object inheritance, and other features.

=== Class ===
A class is a program code template of an object. It provides initial values and implementations of an SSDM object. A class can be defined as either abstract or concrete. A concrete class can be directly used to create an object. Concrete classes can be thought of as feature classes or object classes in the ESRI geodatabase. On the other hand, an abstract class must be inherited to create a concrete class. SSDM abstract classes such as Feature, Feature Archive, and the SSDMSurveyObject describe the core attributes of an SSDM object.

=== Object inheritance ===
The mechanism of object inheritance is based on the idea that many SSDM classes share similar features and it would be inefficient for all of them to define their own version of those features. Object inheritance allows an object using the same implementation with its parent class to best reuse the code. The relationships of objects through inheritance give rise to a hierarchy.

== Classes ==
SSDM defines tens of classes. Among them, some are more important than others.

=== SSDMSurveryObject ===
SSDMSurveryObject is the most important abstract class in SSDM. Its Survey_ID and Survey_ID_Ref class members are used to identify the relationship for all geographic features created by a particular survey project. It defines the basic data of a survey object such as type of survey, survey project name, survey work category, and start/end date.

=== SSDMobject ===
SSDMobject is an abstract class of SSDM. It provides the basic definition of all the SSDM geographic objects. SSDMobject uniquely identifies and describes a geographic object that is acquired, processed, or interpreted from seabed survey data, such as sounding points, and individual pockmark features. Many classes such as SSDMGeohazardObject and SSDMEnvObject are inherited from SSDMobject class and therefore share the core attribute of it.

== SSDM version 2 materials ==
The following is a list of all the materials contained in SSDM version 2, published in 2013.

1. SeabedML GML data exchange format
2. CAD templates for MicroStation and AutoCAD
3. Improved SSDM symbology stylesheet
4. Refined geodatabase template (if warranted based on industry feedback)
5. Example SSDM dataset and improved training materials
6. Technical note on integrating the SSDM with industry pipeline data models e.g. PODS and APDM

== Data migration ==
The SSDM allows survey contractors to provide a standardized method for their customers but it also brings some problems. There are huge amounts of valuable legacy data stored in old standards that cannot be directly used in SSDM. To transfer this data into SSDM for future use, it needs to be imported into ArcGIS first and then loaded into a temporary SSDM data structure. Inside the temporary data structure, data will be cleaned up by adding the required attribution of SSDM and hyperlinking to logs and other geotechnical data. Once the data is complete and meets the requirements of the SSDM standard, it is loaded into the master SSDM database. The combination of SSDM and ArcGIS enables information contained within legacy survey data to be more accessible and much more useful.
