= IBM WebSphere DataPower SOA Appliances =

IBM WebSphere DataPower SOA Appliances is a family of pre-built, pre-configured rack-mountable network devices (XML appliances) designed to accelerate XML and Web Services deployments while extending SOA infrastructure. Originally these devices were created by DataPower Technology Inc., which was acquired by IBM in October 2005.

This WebSphere family consists of hardware and virtual appliances. The appliances are designed to be scalable, with options for high availability and clustering for increased performance and reliability.

== Appliance list ==
=== Based on Hardware Model 9235 ===
- WebSphere DataPower Caching Appliance XC10
- WebSphere DataPower XML Accelerator XA35
- WebSphere DataPower Security Appliance XS40
- WebSphere DataPower Integration Appliance XI50
- WebSphere DataPower B2B Appliance XB60
- WebSphere DataPower Messaging Appliance XM70

This hardware model is a 1U rack mountable appliance that has four Gigabit Ethernet connections.

=== Based on Hardware Model 7198 ===
- WebSphere DataPower Service Gateway XG45

This model is a 1U rack mountable appliance that has four Gigabit Ethernet connections and two 10 Gigabit Ethernet connections.

=== Based on Hardware Model 7199 ===
- WebSphere DataPower Caching Appliance XC10 V2
- WebSphere DataPower Integration Appliance XI52
- WebSphere DataPower B2B Appliance XB62
- [WebSphere DataPower Edge Appliance XE82

This model is a 2U rack mountable appliance that has 8 Gigabit Ethernet connections and 2 10 Gigabit Ethernet connections.

=== Based on Hardware Model 8436 ===
- IBM DataPower Gateway

This model is a 2U rack mountable appliance that has 8 Gigabit Ethernet connections and 2 10 Gigabit Ethernet connections.

== Technical specifications ==
DataPower Appliances contain many hardware components, including ASIC-based IPS, custom encrypted RAID drives, and (optional) Hardware Security Modules.

DataPower Appliances operate a single digitally signed firmware containing a Linux-based operating system and application stack. Its firmware runs on a flash storage device. IBM updates the firmware image every 10–20 weeks. Users cannot run third-party applications on DataPower as they would need a traditional server and operating system. Instead of a traditional filesystem, it runs with a collection of isolated virtual file systems called 'Application Domains'. As a result, it can appear to its client connections to be any type of network file system with any type of folders and links.

DataPower firmware is mostly used to perform electronic messaging functions, like transformation and routing of messages as an enterprise service bus or to protect web services interfaces and the architecture behind them. It helps to integrate any two applications by considering them as services, and is platform and language independent.
