= Open Knowledge Initiative =

Software interface specification organization

The Open Knowledge Initiative (OKI) is an organization responsible for the specification of software interfaces comprising a Service Oriented Architecture (SOA) based on high level service definitions. The OKI specifically focuses on educational software environments.

== Description ==
The Open Knowledge Initiative was initially sponsored by the Andrew W. Mellon Foundation, and the Massachusetts Institute of Technology.

The goal of an SOA is to provide a separation between the interface of a service and its underlying implementation such that consumers (applications) can interoperate across the widest set of service providers (implementations) and providers can easily be swapped on-the-fly without modification to application code. Using this architectural style preserves the software development investment as underlying technologies and mechanisms evolve and allows enterprises to incorporate externally developed application software without the cost of a porting effort to achieve interoperability with an existing computing infrastructure.

OKI has designed and published a suite of software interfaces known as Open Service Interface Definitions (OSIDs), each of which describes a logical computing service. In contrast to other interface definitions that encapsulate a specific technology, an OSID more easily permits a variety of technologies to interoperate through its interfaces for a given service.
