= Islands of automation =

Automation architecture term

Islands of automation was a popular term used largely during the 1980s to describe how rapidly developing automation systems were at first unable to communicate easily with each other. Industrial communication protocols, network technologies, and system integration helped to improve this situation. Just a few of the many examples of helping technologies are Modbus, Fieldbus, Ethernet, etc.

It is more recently used by automation specialists to describe a discrete and fully enclosed automated system applied in a largely manual environment.

In today's interconnected world it is uncommon for automated systems to be fully stand alone. Therefore, the old usage is defunct and the new usage is more appropriate for companies that wish to automate in a limited fashion.
